The 1918 Birthday Honours were appointments by King George V to various orders and honours to reward and highlight good works by citizens of the British Empire. The appointments were made to celebrate the official birthday of The King, 3 June and were published in The London Gazette on the same day, followed by a supplement.

The recipients of honours are displayed here as they were styled before their new honour, and arranged by honour, with classes (Knight, Knight Grand Cross, etc.) and then divisions (Military, Civil, etc.) as appropriate.

United Kingdom and British Empire

Viscount

The Rt. Hon. Sir John Wynford Philipps, Baron St Davids. For continuous public services in the following capacities: Lord Lieutenant of Pembroke; President of the Pembrokeshire Territorial Force Association; First Chairman of the Flour Mills Control Committee; President of the Organisation for the Employment of Retired Officers. 
The Rt. Hon. David Alfred Thomas, Baron Rhondda. For conspicuous public service as Food Controller, 1917–18.

Baron
Sir Matthew Arthur  by the name, style, and title of Baron Glenarthur, of Carlung, in the county of Ayr
Sir William James Tatem  by the name, style, and title of Baron Glanely, of St Fagans, in the county of Glamorgan
George Denison Faber  by the name, style, and title of Baron Wittenham, of Wallingford, in the county of Berks

Privy Councillor
The King appointed the following to His Majesty's Most Honourable Privy Council:

William Adamson 
Sir William Bull  
John Robert Clynes 
Sir Edward Alfred Goulding  
Sir Richard Walter John Hely-Hutchinson, Earl of Donoughmore  
James Ian Macpherson  
Sir Archibald Williamson

Baronetcies
Sir George Washington Baxter  For public and local services.
Major Frank Beachim Beauchamp  For public services.
John George Butcher  For public and Parliamentary services.
Guy Calthrop. For public services as Controller of Coal Mines, and as Head of the Department of the Board of Trade which has control of the coal mines of the United Kingdom.
Sir Edwin Cornwall  For Parliamentary and public services as Minister for National Health Insurance. 
Robert Leicester Harmsworth  For Parliamentary and public services. 
Robert McAlpine  For continuous public and patriotic service for many years in the provision of Workmen's Dwellings and the creation of Garden Cities, and for meritorious war work in the construction of Shell Factories in Scotland and England.
William James Peake Mason  For public and local services.
Colonel Sir Herbert James Francis Parsons. For public and patriotic services. 
Sir Charles Petrie. For public and local services. 
Colonel Edward Pryce-Jones  For public and parliamentary services. 
Robert Thomas. For public services in founding the Welsh Heroes Memorial Fund, and in supporting the British and Foreign Sailors Society and Bangor University.
Lieutenant-Colonel Rhys Williams  For public and local services as Chairman of the Quarter Sessions for the last 12 years.

Knight Bachelor

Frank Baines  For important and valuable services rendered to the Office of Works, Ministry of Munitions, Admiralty, War Office, Air Ministry, and other Departments.
Harry Baldwin  For service as Dental Surgeon to His Majesty for a number of years and as head of the Kennington Facial Hospital; and also for scientific studies pursued in connection with the War in France.
James Benjamin Ball. For eminent services as Controller of Timber Supplies since 1917.
Charles Henry Burge  For active leadership in local patriotic work.
Alfred Butt, Theatrical Manager. For generous and useful contributions to War Charities and war work. 
Thomas Octavius Callender  For active leadership in local patriotic work.
Colonel Charles Chalmers  For public and local services.
John Charles Lewis Coward,  For long continued public services.
Archibald Davis Dawnay. For local and patriotic services in the extension of allotments, the training of men, and the Chairmanship of War Funds
Harry Seymour Foster  For public services for many years. 
W.E. Foster  For public and local services.
John Meadows Frost  For public and local services.
Walter Matthew Gibson  In 1880 he entered the Privy Purse under Queen Victoria, and in 1888 was appointed Secretary of the Privy Purse.
Park Goff. For services rendered to the Foreign Office during the War, in the course of which he received severe injuries.
Major Archibald Gilbey Gold  For public and patriotic services. 
James Hacking. For active leadership in local patriotic work. 
John George Harbottle For active leadership in local patriotic work.
A. G. Jeans, Editor of The Liverpool Post.
Thomas Lee-Roberts. County Councillor for Bedfordshire. For public and local services.
John Merry le Sage. Editor of The Daily Telegraph.
Thomas William Lewis. For services rendered as Stipendiary Magistrate for 20 years, and as Senior Wreck Commissioner. 
R. B. D. Muir. For services rendered as Treasury Counsel
Peter Peacock. For active leadership in local patriotic work.
George Peters  For public and local services.
John Reid  For public and local services as Director of Glasgow Chamber of Commerce. 
Mayo Robson  For services rendered as Honorary Consulting Surgeon at the King Edward VII Memorial Hospital, Windsor. 
Gerald Walter Roffey. For services rendered in the Ministry of Food since 1917, and as Chairman of the Home-Grown Cereals Committee of the Royal Commission on Wheat Supply.
Edgar Christian Sanders. For services rendered as Clerk for many years to the Liverpool Justices. 
Ernest Shentall. For public and local services.
Peter Wyatt Squire. For services rendered as Chemist, for 50 years, to the Royal Family.
The Rt. Hon. William Alexander Forster Todd  For public and local services.
Alfred Warren  For public and local services.
Ernest Edward Wild  For public services.
Percy Woodhouse  For public and local services.

British India
Logie Pirie Watson, Partner in Messrs. Cooper, Allen & Co., Cawnpore, United Provinces, and a Member of the Council of the Lieutenant-Governor for making Laws and Regulations
Deba Prosad Sarbadhikari  Vice-Chancellor, Calcutta University, Bengal
Nilratan Sarkar  Medical Practitioner, Calcutta, Bengal
Gordon Fraser, Managing Director, Messrs. Best and Co., Ltd. Madras
Hormasji Ardeshir Wadia, Barrister-at-Law, Bombay
Robert Aitken, Secretary and Treasurer, Bank of Bombay, Bombay
Raj Bahadur Seth Sarupchand Hukamchand, Banker, Central India
Edward Denison Ross  Principal of the School of Oriental Studies

The Most Noble Order of the Garter

Knight of the Most Noble Order of the Garter (KG)
Henry John Brinsley Manners, Duke of Rutland

The Most Ancient and Most Noble Order of the Thistle

Knight of the Most Ancient and Most Noble Order of the Thistle (KT)
Brigadier-General John George Stewart-Murray, Duke of Atholl

The Most Illustrious Order of Saint Patrick

Knight of the Order of Saint Patrick (KP)
Geoffrey Henry Browne, Baron Oranmore and Browne

The Most Honourable Order of the Bath

Knight Grand Cross of the Order of the Bath (GCB)

Military Division
Royal Navy
Vice-Admiral Sir Rosslyn Erskine Wemyss 

Army
General Sir Arthur Arnold Barrett  General, Indian Army

Knight Commander of the Order of the Bath (KCB)
Military Division
Royal Navy
Surgeon-General Humphry Davy Rolleston 

Army
For valuable services rendered in connection with Military Operations in France and Flanders —
Major-General Hugh Sandham Jeudwine 
Major-General Colin John Mackenzie 
Major-General Reginald John Pinney 
Major-General Arthur Binny Scott 

Canadian Force
Major-General Henry Edward Burstall 

Civil Division
Sir Howard George Frank, Director-General of Lands, War Office, Ministry of Munitions and Air Ministry
Lieutenant-Colonel The Rt. Hon. Sir Frederick Edward Grey Ponsonby  Keeper of His Majesty's Privy Purse, and Extra Equerry to His Majesty

Companion of the Order of the Bath (CB)
Military Division
Royal Navy
Capt. The Hon. Hubert George Brand  (Commodore, First Class)
Rear-Admiral Edward Francis Bruen
Capt. John Ewen Cameron 
Capt. Charles Douglas Carpendale (Commodore, Second Class)
Capt. Henry Montagu Doughty
Vice-Admiral Seymour Elphinstone Erskine
Capt. Cecil Henry Fox
Surgeon-General Patrick Brodie Handyside 
Deputy Surgeon-General Robert Hill 
Lieutenant-Colonel Alexander Richard Hamilton Hutchison  Royal Marine Light Infantry
Capt. Edward Buxton Kiddle 
Capt. Robert Neale Lawson
Rear-Admiral James Clement Ley 
Rear-Admiral John Scott Luard
Lieutenant-Colonel Frederick William Lumsden  Royal Marine Artillery
Capt. Crawford Maclachlan
Capt. Vincent Barkly Molteno
Paymaster-in-Chief James Elliot Vowler Morton
Rear-Admiral The Hon. Victor Albert Stanley 
Engineer Capt. William Toop
Capt. Edwin Veale Underhill
Capt. Lionel de Lautour Wells  (Commodore, First Class)

Army
Lieutenant-General Sir Herbert Vaughan Cox  Indian Army
Lieutenant-General Havelock Hudson  Indian Army
Colonel Philip John Miles, Indian Army
Colonel Leslie Waterfield Shakespear, Indian Army
Lieutenant-Colonel John Blackburn Smith  Indian Medical Service
Colonel Edward Langford Sullivan  Indian Army

For valuable services rendered in connection with Military Operations in France and Flanders —

Temp Major-General Sir Anthony Alfred Bowlby  Army Medical Service
Temp Major-General Cuthbert Sidney Wallace  Army Medical Service
Lieutenant-Colonel and Brevet Colonel Fortescue John Nason 
Lieutenant-Colonel and Brevet Colonel Charles Bell Watkins (late Royal Artillery)
Colonel and Hon. Brigadier-General John Burnard Edwards  Labour Corps
Colonel John Charles Basil Eastwood 
Lieutenant-Colonel and Hon. Colonel Charles William Trotter  Yeomanry
Colonel George Barton Smith  Army Pay Department
Colonel Charles Godby  Royal Engineers
Colonel Frederick James Parker
Lieutenant-Colonel and Brevet Colonel Thomas Wykes Gibbard  Army Medical Service
Colonel Stuart Macdonald  Army Medical Service
Lieutenant-Colonel and Brevet Colonel Allan James Macnab  Indian Medical Service
Colonel Charles Richard Jebb Griffith  Bedfordshire Regiment
Colonel Thomas Owen Marden 
Lieutenant-Colonel and Brevet Colonel James Hawkins-Whitshed Pollard  Royal Scots Fusiliers
1st Colonel and Brevet Colonel Frederick Courtenay Longuet Hulton
Colonel Valentine Murray  (late Royal Engineers)
Colonel Edgar Montague Pilcher  Army Medical Service
Lieutenant-Colonel and Brevet Colonel William Bain Richardson Sandys  Royal Artillery
Lieutenant-Colonel and Brevet Colonel Richard Ashmore Colley Wellesley  Royal Artillery
Lieutenant-Colonel and Brevet Colonel Philip Gordon Grant  Royal Engineers
Major and Brevet Colonel Gwyn Venables Hordern  King's Royal Rifle Corps
Lieutenant-Colonel and Brevet Colonel Charles Levinge Gregory (Indian Cavalry)
Major and Brevet Colonel Louis Ridley Vaughan  Indian Army
Lieutenant-Colonel and Brevet Colonel Alexander Edwin de la Voye  Army Service Corps
Lieutenant-Colonel and Brevet Colonel Lyons David Fraser  Royal Artillery
Lieutenant-Colonel and Brevet Colonel Bertram Richard Kirwan  Royal Artillery
Major and Brevet Colonel George Darell Jeffreys  Grenadier Guards
Lieutenant-Colonel and Brevet Colonel William Garnett Braithwaite  Royal Welsh Fusiliers
Colonel George St. Clair Thorn  Army Medical Service
Colonel Frederick Potts  Royal Artillery
Lieutenant-Colonel William Duncan Conabeare Trimnell  Army Ordnance Depot
Major and Brevet Lieutenant-Colonel Charles Lionel Kirwan Campbell  Lancers (Since deceased. To date 30 March 1918.) 
Major and Brevet Colonel Kenneth Wigram  Gurkha Rifles, Indian Army
Temp Lieutenant-Colonel Ralph Lewis Wedgwood 
Lieutenant-Colonel and Brevet Colonel Sydney D'Aguilar Crookshank  Royal Engineers

Canadian Force
Major and Brevet Lieutenant-Colonel James Harold Elmsley  Royal Canadian Dragoons
Colonel Huntly Douglas Brodie Ketchen  Lord Strathcona's Horse
Colonel Frederick Oscar Warren Loomis  Quebec Regiment
Victor Wentworth Odlum  British Columbia Regiment
Colonel Robert Rennie  Central Ontario Regiment
Colonel Arthur Edward Ross  Canadian Army Medical Corps

Australian Imperial Force
Colonel Harold William Grimwade 
Colonel Alfred Joseph Bessell-Browne 
Colonel Harold Edward Elliott 

For services in connection with the War —
Major-General Nathaniel Walter Barnardiston 
Colonel Julian Robert John Jocelyn
Colonel Shafto Longfield Craster  Royal Engineers
Colonel Raymund Crawford, Army Ordnance Depot
Colonel Bernard Francis Drake
Colonel Horace Francis Kays
Colonel Nesbitt Breillat Heffernan, Royal Artillery
Lieutenant-Colonel and Brevet Colonel Casimir Cartwright van Straubenzee  Royal Artillery
Lieutenant-Colonel and Brevet Colonel Edward Bailey Ashmore  Royal Artillery
Lieutenant-Colonel and Brevet Colonel John Byron, Royal Field Artillery
Colonel James Douglas McLachlan  
Lieutenant-Colonel and Brevet Colonel William Knapp Tarver, Army Service Corps 
Major and Brevet Colonel Borlase Edward Wyndham Childs  Duke of Cornwall's Light Infantry
Lieutenant-Colonel-and Brevet Colonel Herbert William Studd  Coldstream Guards
Lieutenant-Colonel John Cecil Armstrong  Army Pay Department
Colonel George Bradshaw Stanistreet  Army Medical Service
Temp Lieutenant-Colonel James Leigh-Wood 
Lieutenant-Colonel and Brevet Colonel Charles Edward Wyncoll, late Army Service Corps
Major Sir Charles Vere Gunning  late Durham Light Infantry

Canadian Forces
Major-General Garnet Burk Hughes, British Columbia Regiment
Major-General William Alexander Logie
Colonel Alexander Primrose, Canadian Army Medical Corps

For valuable services rendered in connection with Military Operations in Salonika —
Major and Brevet Colonel George Norton Cory  Royal Dublin Fusiliers
Lieutenant-Colonel and Brevet Colonel John Duncan  Royal Scots Fusiliers
Colonel Gerald Thomas Rawnsley  Army Medical Service

For valuable services rendered in connection with Military Operations in Egypt —
Temp. Lieutenant-Colonel James William Barrett  Royal Army Medical Corps
Captain and Brevet Lieutenant-Colonel Guy Payan Dawnay  late Coldstream Guards
Major and Brevet Colonel Eric Stanley Girdwood, Scottish Rifles
Colonel Alfred Ernest Conquer Keble 
Colonel Harry Davis Watson  Indian Army

For valuable services rendered in connection with Military Operations on the Indian Frontier (Dated 1 January 1918) —
Lieutenant-Colonel and Brevet Colonel Hon. Charles Granville Bruce  Gurkha Rifles, Indian Army

For valuable services rendered in connection with Military Operations in Italy —
Colonel Christopher Reginald Buckle  Royal Artillery
Lieutenant-Colonel and Brevet Colonel Thomas Stanton Lambert  East Lancashire Regiment
Lieutenant-Colonel Charles Hamilton Mitchell  Central Ontario Regiment

Royal Air Force
Colonel Arthur Vyell Vyvyan 

Civil Division
Rear-Admiral Owen Francis Gillett
Capt. Guy Reginald Archer Gaunt 
Engineer Capt. William Herbert Beckett  
Engineer Capt. Charles William John Bearblock  
Capt. Herbert Lyon  (Vice-Admiral, retired)
Colonel Arthur Glanville Tatham, Royal Marine Artillery 
Colonel John Rawdon Hodge Oldfield, Royal Marine Light Infantry
Commander Ernest Edward Lacy  
Fleet Paymaster George Hughlings Armstrong Willis  
Commander Hubert George Alston  
Lieutenant-Commander Alban Lewis Gwynne  
Edward Raoul Bate
Basil Mott, Member of the War Office Committee on Hutted Camps
Colonel George Robert Canning, Baron Harris  County Commandant, Kent Volunteer Force, Military Member (late President) Kent Territorial Force Association
Colonel Robert Cecil Winder  Territorial Force Reserve, Secretary East Lancashire Territorial Force Association
Sir Hugh Bell  H.M. Lieutenant for the North Riding of Yorkshire, President North Riding of Yorkshire Territorial Force Association
Richard Dalgliesh  Chairman Leicestershire Territorial Force Association
Colonel Sir Archibald Mclnnes Shaw  Military Member (late President) City of Glasgow Territorial Force Association
John Evelyn Shuckburgh, Secretary in the Political Department, India Office
Lieutenant-Colonel Clive Wigram  Equerry and Assistant Private Secretary to His Majesty
Sydney A. Armitage-Smith, Principal Clerk, Treasury
Henry W. W. McAnally, Assistant Secretary, Air Ministry
Edward Howard Marsh  Private Secretary to the Minister of Munitions
Samuel Murray Power, Irish Office
Capt. Stephen George Tallents, Assistant Secretary in charge of Local Authorities Division, Ministry of Food

In recognition of services in connection with the War —
John William Stewart Anderson  Staff Assistant Secretary, Admiralty
Henry Heath Fawcett, Director of Army Contracts, War Office
Arthur Belmore Lowry, Chief Inspector, Local Government Board
Hugh Malcolm Robinson  Chief Inspector of Factories, Home Office
James Arthur Salter, Director of Shipping Requisitioning, Ministry of Shipping
Sir Arthur John Tedder, Commissioner of Customs and Excise
Lieutenant-Colonel Sir William George Eden Wiseman  Foreign Office

The Most Exalted Order of the Star of India

Knight Grand Commander (GCSI)
His Excellency The Rt. Hon. Sir John Sinclair, Baron Pentland  Governor of Madras
His Excellency Sir Freeman Freeman-Thomas, Baron Willingdon  Governor of Bombay

Knight Commander (KCSI)
Sir William Henry Hoare Vincent, Indian Civil Service, an Ordinary Member of the Council of the Governor-General of India

In recognition of meritorious services in connection with the War —
Sir Thomas Henry Holland  President, Indian Munitions Board

Companion (CSI)
Henry Staveley Lawrence, Indian Civil Service, Commissioner in Sind, Bombay
Llewellyn Eddison Buckley, Indian Civil Service, Commissioner of Revenue Settlement, Survey, Land (Records and Agriculture, Board of Revenue, Madras)
Cecil Henry Bompas, Indian Civil Service, Chairman of the Board of Trustees for the Improvement of Calcutta
Moses Mordecai Simeon Gubbay  Indian Civil Service, Controller of Currency

In recognition of meritorious services in connection with the War —
Colonel John McNeill Walter  (to be dated 1 January 1918)
Major-General Richard Wapshare

The Most Distinguished Order of Saint Michael and Saint George

Knight Grand Cross of the Order of St Michael and St George (GCMG)
The Rt. Hon. Sir George Eulas Foster  Minister of Trade and Commerce of the Dominion of Canada. Representative of Canada on the Royal Commission on the Natural Resources, Trade and Legislation of certain portions of His Majesty's Dominions.
Sir Owen Cosby Philipps  for services to the Dominions and Colonies in connection with Shipping and other matters.

Knight Commander of the Order of St Michael and St George (KCMG)
Admiral Sir Lewis Bayly 
Capt. Sir Herbert Acton Blake 
Professor John Cadman  for services in connection with oil-bearing lands in the Colonies.
Sir Timothy Augustine Coghlan  lately Agent-General in London for the State of New South Wales.
The Hon. John Douglas Hazen  Chief Justice of New Brunswick, lately Minister of Marine and Fisheries, and Minister of the Naval Service, Dominion of Canada.
John Michael Higgins, in recognition of services to the Commonwealth of Australia.
His Honour Richard Stuart Lake, Lieutenant Governor of the Province of Saskatchewan
Edward Fancourt Mitchell  In recognition of services to the Commonwealth of Australia
Rear-Admiral Hugh Henry Darby Tothill  
Charles Alban Young  His Majesty's Envoy Extraordinary and Minister Plenipotentiary to, and Consul-General for the Republics of Guatemala, Honduras, Nicaragua and Salvador.

For services rendered in connection with the War —

Colonel William Heaton Horrocks  Army Medical Service
Colonel Henry Cecil Lowther  
Temp Major-General Sir Berkeley George Moynihan 
Temp Colonel Sir Ronald Ross  Army Medical Service
Colonel Harold Lewis Tagart 

For services rendered in connection with Military Operations in France and Flanders —
Hon. Major-General Claude Arthur Bray 
Colonel Sir William Boog Leishman 
Surgeon-General Menus William O'Keefe 
Major-General Andrew Mitchell Stuart

Companion of the Order of St Michael and St George (CMG)
The Hon. Aretas Akers-Douglas, First Secretary in His Majesty's Diplomatic Service
Capt. Forster Delafield Arnold-Forster  
Fleet-Surgeon Percy William Bassett-Smith 
Capt. George Parker Bevan  (Commodore, 2nd Class)
Austin Ernest Blount, Clerk of the Senate of the Dominion of Canada
John William Borden, Accountant and Paymaster-General, Department of Militia and Defence, Dominion of Canada
Commander Hector Boyes  
Colonel George Brand, District Staff Officer in the Orange Free State, South African Defence Force
Fleet-Surgeon Edward Button  
Donald Charles Cameron, Central Secretary, Nigeria
Fleet-Surgeon Frederick James Abercrombie Dalton  
Capt. Leonard Andrew Boyd Donaldson  
Capt. Lawrence Leopold Dundas  
Benjamin Eastwood, General Manager of the Uganda Railway
Capt. William Leslie Elder  
Thomas Edward Fell, Colonial Secretary of the Island of Barbados
Henry Lindo Ferguson  Professor of Ophthalmology and Dean of the Medical Faculty, University of Otago, Dominion of New Zealand
The Hon. Tetley Gant, President of the Legislative Council of the State of Tasmania and Chancellor of the University of Tasmania
Capt. Herbert Neville Garnett  
Thomas Gill  Under Treasurer of the State of South Australia
Capt. Robert Woodyear Glennie  
Capt. Rupert Stanley Gwatkin-Williams  
Fleet-Surgeon David Walker Hewitt 
Fleet-Surgeon William Wallace Keir 
Rear-Admiral Thomas Webster Kemp 
Capt. Theobald Walter Butler Kennedy  
George Jardine Kidston, First Secretary in His Majesty's Diplomatic Service
Adrian Knox  recognition of services to the Commonwealth of Australia
Arthur Henry Lemon, British Resident, Negri Sembilan, Federated Malay States
Major Arthur Greenway Little, Royal Marine Light Infantry
Herbert William Malkin, Assistant Legal Adviser in the Foreign Office
Fleet-Paymaster Herbert Stanley Measham  
Capt. Raymond Andrew Nugent  
Capt. Frederick Owen Pike  (Vice-Admiral, retired)
Josephus Hargreaves Richardson, Commissioner, Government Insurance Department, Dominion of New Zealand
Fleet-Paymaster Henshaw Robert Russell  
Major Richard James Saumarez, Royal Marine Light Infantry
Capt. Cyril Samuel Townsend  
Capt. Cecil Vivian Usborne  
Capt. Gerald William Vivian  
Engineer-Capt. Henry Wall  
Capt. John Fenwick Warton  
Fleet-Paymaster Frederick Richard Waymouth

For services with the war
For services rendered in connection with the War 
Captain Donald John Armour, Royal Army Medical Corps
Major Francis Remi Imbert Athill, Northumberland Fusiliers
Major Frank Shelston Headon Baldrey 
Colonel Colin Robert Ballard 
Colonel Sir Hilary William Wellesley Barlow 
Quartermaster and Hon. Lieutenant-Colonel James Barry, Remount Serv. 
Colonel Henry Arthur Bethel
Colonel Frederick Gordon Blair  Yeomanry
Colonel and Hon. Major-General Francis George Bond  (late Royal Engineers)
Hon. Lieutenant-Colonel Lionel Forbes Bridges, Remount Serv
Temp Major Joseph William Forster Brittlebank, Army Veterinary Corps
Major and Brevet Colonel Basil Thorold Buckley, Northumberland Fusiliers
Major John Dashwood Buller  Army Service Corps
Colonel and Hon. Brigadier-General John Francis Burn-Murdoch 
Colonel William Freemantle Cahusac (late Indian Army)
Colonel Herbert Clement Carey, Colonel Henry Stanhope Sloman 
Lieutenant-Colonel and Brevet Colonel Alexander Hepburne Barrington Cavaye, late Staff
Captain and Brevet Major Herbert Henry Spender Clay  (M.P.), late L. Guards
Major and Brevet Lieutenant-Colonel Jacinth D'Ewes Fitz-Ercald Coke, Army Service Corps
Lieutenant-Colonel Alfred Fothergill Cooke, Army Pay Department
Colonel Archibald Crawford
Lieutenant-Colonel Mordaunt Abingdon Carlisle Crowe, Royal Artillery
Major and Brevet Lieutenant-Colonel Claude Edward Marjoribanks Dansey, Monmouthshire Regiment
Lieutenant-Colonel Hon. Horace Scott Davey, Hussars
Major and Brevet Lieutenant-Colonel Osborne Herbert Delano-Osborne, Royal Scots Fusiliers
Lieutenant-Colonel Maxwell Earle  Grenadier Guards
Colonel Michael Henry Egan
Colonel Frederick Baumgardt Elmslie 
Colonel Francis Alexander Fortescue 
Major and Brevet Lieutenant-Colonel Henry Nedham Foster, Army Service Corps
Colonel John Fowle 
Colonel Edward Hamilton Seymour 
Major and Hon. Lieutenant-Colonel Alan Percy George Gough  late Royal Welsh Fusiliers
Major and Brevet Lieutenant-Colonel Walter Harold Gribbon, Royal Lancaster Regiment
Major and Hon. Lieutenant-Colonel Robert de Bray Hassell, late Res. Artillery (Empld. Remount. Serv.)
Lieutenant-Colonel Alleyne Haynes, Army Pay Department
Lieutenant-Colonel Barnard Thornton Hodgson, Royal Sussex Regiment
Lieutenant-Colonel William Henry Webley Hope, Royal Artillery
Lieutenant-Colonel Francis Stephen Irvine  Royal Army Medical Corps
Major and Brevet Lieutenant-Colonel Albert Victor Jenner  late Rifles Brigade
Colonel Sir Charles Wallis King 
Lieutenant-Colonel and Brevet Colonel Morton Herbert Knaggs, Army Ordnance Depot
Lieutenant-Colonel and Brevet Colonel William Bernard Lauder, Army Pay Department
Lieutenant-Colonel Sir Arthur Leetham  Retired, Royal Engineers
Lieutenant-Colonel Stratford Edward St. Leger  Royal Irish Regiment
Major and Brevet Lieutenant-Colonel Clive Gerard Liddell  Leicestershire Regiment
Temp Lieutenant-Colonel James Fraser Liste  Royal Engineers
Lieutenant-Colonel Charles Hawker   Royal Artillery
Major and Brevet Lieutenant-Colonel Clarence Reginald Macdonald, Royal Warwickshire Regiment
Colonel Douglas Lilburn MacEwen 
Lieutenant-Colonel Richard Oliver Marton  Royal Garrison Artillery
Major Ralph Micklem, Royal Engineers
Lieutenant-Colonel and Brevet Colonel Hill Godfrey Morgan  (late Army Service Corps)
Major Charles David Murray
Lieutenant-Colonel Andrew Bellew Nolan, Army Pay Department
Major and Brevet Lieutenant-Colonel Gordon Ogilvie, Royal Artillery
Captain and Brevet Major Laurie Charles Frith Oppenheim (late Dragoon Guards), Highland Light Infantry
Temp Lieutenant-Colonel Herbert Watkins Pitchford, Army Veterinary Corps
Major Thomas Andrew Poison, empld. Army Ordnance Depot
Major and Brevet Lieutenant-Colonel John James Porteous (late Royal Artillery), Remount Serv
Lieutenant-Colonel and Brevet Colonel Arthur Spencer Pratt  (late Royal Artillery), Remount Serv
Major Frederick Kaye Puckle, Army Service Corps
Colonel Herman Le Roy-Lewis 
Major and Brevet Lieutenant-Colonel Edward Carew Sanders  (late Royal Artillery) Remount Directorate
Lieutenant-Colonel and Brevet Colonel Charles Inglis Scott, Army Pay Department
Colonel William Apsley-Smith 
Temp Lieutenant-Colonel Arthur Smithells
Colonel Richard John Strachey
Lieutenant-Colonel Sir Henry Beaufoy Thornhill  Indian Army
Major and Brevet Lieutenant-Colonel Herbert William Todhunter, King's Own Scottish Borderers
Lieutenant-Colonel Ralph Douglas Turton, Military Detention Barracks
Major and Brevet Lieutenant-Colonel Walter King Venning  Duke of Cornwall's Light Infantry
Lieutenant-Colonel Robert Austen Vigne, Royal Artillery
Major and Brevet Lieutenant-Colonel John Bayford Wells  North Lancashire Regiment
Temp Major Ernest Arthur Weston, Royal Engineers, Inland Waterways and Docks
Lieutenant-Colonel Frederick Ernest Whitton, Leinster Regiment
Colonel Henry David Williams
Lieutenant-Colonel George Mostyn Williams, Army Veterinary Corps
Temp Lieutenant-Colonel Sir William George Eden Wiseman 
Temp Colonel Arthur Stanley Woodwork  Army Medical Service
Lieutenant-Colonel Harry Stevenson Wright, Army Service Corps

Canadian Force
Temp Major-General Sir Anthony Alfred Bowlby  Army Medical Service
Lieutenant-Colonel and Brevet Colonel William Garnett Braithwaite  Royal Welsh Fusiliers
Major and Brevet Lieutenant-Colonel Charles Lionel Kirwan Campbell  Lancers (Since deceased. To date 30 March 1918.) 
Lieutenant-Colonel and Brevet Colonel Sydney D'Aguilar Crookshank  Royal Engineers
Colonel John Charles Basil Eastwood 
Colonel and Hon. Brigadier-General John Burnard Edwards  Labour Corps
Lieutenant-Colonel and Brevet Colonel Lyons David Fraser  Royal Artillery
Lieutenant-Colonel and Brevet Colonel Thomas Wykes Gibbard  Army Medical Service
Colonel Charles Godby  Royal Engineers
Lieutenant-Colonel and Brevet Colonel Philip Gordon Grant  Royal Engineers
Lieutenant-Colonel and Brevet Colonel Charles Levinge Gregory Indian Cavalry
Colonel Charles Richard Jebb Griffith  Bedfordshire Regiment
Major and Brevet Colonel Gwyn Venables Hordern  King's Royal Rifle Corps
1st Colonel and Brevet Colonel Frederick Courtenay Longuet Hulton
Major and Brevet Colonel George Darell Jeffreys  Grenadier Guards
Lieutenant-Colonel and Brevet Colonel Bertram Richard Kirwan  Royal Artillery
Colonel Stuart Macdonald  Army Medical Service
Lieutenant-Colonel and Brevet Colonel Allan James Macnab  Indian Medical Service
Colonel Thomas Owen Marden 
Colonel Valentine Murray  (late Royal Engineers)
Lieutenant-Colonel and Brevet Colonel Fortescue John Nason 
Colonel Frederick James Parker
Colonel Edgar Montague Pilcher  Army Medical Service
Lieutenant-Colonel and Brevet Colonel James Hawkins Whitshed Pollard  Royal Scots Fusiliers
Colonel Frederick Potts  Royal Artillery
Lieutenant-Colonel and Brevet Colonel William Bain Richardson Sandys  Royal Artillery
Colonel George Barton Smith  Army Pay Department
Colonel George St. Clair Thorn  Army Medical Service
Lieutenant-Colonel William Duncan Conabeare Trimnell  Army Ordnance Depot
Lieutenant-Colonel and Hon. Colonel Charles William Trotter  Yeomanry
Major and Brevet Colonel Louis Ridley Vaughan  Indian Army
Lieutenant-Colonel and Brevet Colonel Alexander Edwin de la Voye  Army Service Corps
Temp Major-General Cuthbert Sidney Wallace  Army Medical Service
Lieutenant-Colonel and Brevet Colonel Charles Bell Watkins (late Royal Artillery)
Temp Lieutenant-Colonel Ralph Lewis Wedgwood 
Lieutenant-Colonel and Brevet Colonel Richard Ashmore Colley Wellesley  Royal Artillery
Major and Brevet Colonel Kenneth Wigram  Gurkha Rifles, Indian Army

Australian Force
Major Harry Smalley Evans, Australian Army Pay Corps

New Zealand Force
Lieutenant-Colonel John Alexander MacKenzie, Otago Regiment
Lieutenant-Colonel Cyril Hocken Tewsley, N.Z. Medical Corps

Newfoundland Contingent
Major Cluny Macpherson  Royal Newfoundland Regiment

In recognition of distinguished services rendered in connection with the War —
Major Ralph Kirby Bagnall-Wild 
Lieutenant-Colonel Bertie Clephane Hawley Drew 
Lieutenant-Colonel Cuthbert Gurney Hoare 
Lieutenant-Colonel Alfred Huggins 
Major Charles Frederick Lee 
Lieutenant-Colonel John Cyril Porte 
Lieutenant-Colonel William Ward Warner 

In recognition of distinguished service in the theatre of War —
Lieutenant-Colonel John Harold Whitworth Becke 

For services rendered in connection with Military Operations in Salonika —
Major and Brevet Lieutenant-Colonel William Alan Blake  Wiltshire Regiment
Major and Brevet Lieutenant-Colonel Alexander Henry Watkins Grubb  Royal Engineers
Lieutenant-Colonel Brian John Michael Luck  Royal Garrison Artillery
Major and Brevet Lieutenant-Colonel Alexander Duncan Macpherson  Cameron Highlanders
Lieutenant-Colonel and Brevet Colonel Charles Henry Macintire-Hitchins, (late Indian Army), Labour-Corps
Major and Brevet Colonel Charles Clarkson Martin-Maynard  Devonshire Regiment
Major and Brevet Lieutenant-Colonel Richard Elles Solly-Flood  Rifle Brigade
Major and Brevet Lieutenant-Colonel Charles-George Woodburn Hunter  Royal Engineers
Major and Brevet Lieutenant-Colonel Bertram Fitzherbert Widdrington  King's Royal Rifle Corps
Major and Brevet Lieutenant-Colonel Ernest Douglas Young, Devonshire Regiment

For services rendered with the British Forces on the Mediterranean Line of Communications —
Temp. Colonel George Lethbridge Colvin 
Temp. Major Wulff Henry Grey  Royal Engineers

For services rendered in connection with Military Operations on the Indian Frontier (Dated 1 January 1918)
Colonel Charles Camac Luard

For valuable services rendered in connection with Military Operations in Italy —
Major and Brevet Lieutenant-Colonel Baptist Barton Crozier  Royal Artillery
Lieutenant-Colonel Robert Henry Frederick McCulloch  Royal Garrison Artillery
Major and Brevet Lieutenant-Colonel Gordon Charles William Gordon-Hall  King's Own Yorkshire Light Infantry
George Herbert Leonard Hammerton  Royal Army Medical Corps
Lieutenant-Colonel and Brevet Colonel Arthur Blois Ross Hildebrand  Royal Engineers
Major and Brevet Lieutenant-Colonel Bertram John Lang  Argyll & Sutherland Highlanders
Colonel Eric Pearce-Serocold, King's Royal Rifle Corps
Lieutenant-Colonel and Brevet Colonel William Strong  Royal Artillery
Lieutenant-Colonel The Hon. Maurice Anthony Wingfield  Rifle Brigade

For services rendered in connection with Military Operations in France and Flanders —
Lieutenant-Colonel Robert Berkeley Airey  Army Service Corps
Lieutenant-Colonel William Henry Lorraine Allgood 
Major Frederick Henry Allhusen  Yeomanry
Lieutenant Colonel and Brevet Colonel Austin Thomas Anderson, Royal Artillery
Lieutenant-Colonel Rowland James Percy Anderson  Hussars
Major and Brevet Lieutenant-Colonel Charles Clement Armitage, Royal Artillery
Major Edward Armstrong  Highland Light Infantry
Lieutenant-Colonel John Maurice Arthur  Royal Engineers
Major and Brevet Lieutenant-Colonel Vivian Telford Bailey  Liverpool Regiment
Temp Lieutenant-Colonel Edward Metcalfe Beall  Liverpool Regiment
Lieutenant-Colonel Alfred Bryan Bethell  Royal Field Artillery
Captain and Brevet Lieutenant-Colonel Hugh Keppel Bethell  Hussars
Lieutenant-Colonel William Richard Blackwell, Royal Army Medical Corps
Major and Brevet Lieutenant-Colonel Oswald Cuthbert Borrett  Royal Lancaster Regiment 
Major and Brevet Lieutenant-Colonel Alan Brough  Royal Engineers
Lieutenant-Colonel Claud Lorn Campbell-Hamilton  Royal Artillery 
Lieutenant-Colonel and Brevet Colonel George Gias Sandeman Carey  Royal Artillery
Major and Brevet Lieutenant-Colonel Charles Murray Carpenter  Royal Engineers
Captain Sydney Herbert Charrington  Tank Battalion, late Hussars
LieutenantColonel Sir Smith Hill Child  Royal Field Artillery 
Lieutenant-Colonel William Ellis Clark  Royal Artillery
Major and Brevet Lieutenant-Colonel Bertie Gordon Clay  Dragoon Guards
Colonel Robert William Clements 
Major and Brevet Lieutenant-Colonel John Francis Stanhope Duke Coleridge  Gurkha Rifles, Indian Army
Lieutenant-Colonel Harold Collinson  Royal Army Medical Corps
Lieutenant Colonel Arthur Edward Osmond Congdon, Royal Munster Fusiliers
Lieutenant-Colonel George Trevor-Roper Cook  Hussars
Colonel John Francis Craig, late Royal Artillery
Major and Brevet Lieutenant-Colonel Claude Raul Champion de Crespigny  Grenadier Guards
Major and Brevet Lieutenant-Colonel Francis Henry Dansey  Wiltshire Regiment
Lieutenant-Colonel Archibald James Ferguson Eden  Oxfordshire & Buckinghamshire Light Infantry 
Major and Brevet Lieutenant-Colonel Gilbert Charles Edward Elliott  Royal Engineers
Lieutenant-Colonel William Evans  Royal Artillery
Major and Brevet Lieutenant-Colonel Harold Mynors Farmar  Lancashire Fusiliers
Lieutenant-Colonel Arthur Baron Florman  Royal Horse Artillery
Lieutenant-Colonel George Norman Bowes Forster  Royal Warwickshire Regiment
Major and Brevet Colonel Gilbert Robertson Frith  Royal Engineers
Lieutenant-Colonel James Stuart Gallic  Army Medical Service
Major Reynold Alexander Gillam  Royal Engineers
Lieutenant-Colonel and Brevet Colonel Godfrey Gillson  Royal Artillery
Lieutenant-Colonel William Fanshawe London Gordon  Norfolk Regiment
Lieutenant-Colonel Thomas Arthur Granger  Indian Medical Service
Major and Temp Colonel Henry McIlree Williamson Gray  Royal Army Medical Corps
Brevet Lieutenant-Colonel Christopher Joseph Griffin  Lancashire Fusiliers
Lieutenant-Colonel Gwyn Gwyn-Thomas  Indian Army
Lieutenant-Colonel Albert Ernest Hamerton  Royal Army Medical Corps
Lieutenant-Colonel Alexander Ramsay Harman  Worcestershire Regiment
Lieutenant-Colonel James Andrew Hartigan  Royal Army Medical Corps
Captain and Brevet Major Otway Charles Herbert  Argyll & Sutherland Highlanders
Temp Major Frederick Thomas George Hobday  Army Veterinary Corps
Major and Brevet Lieutenant-Colonel Clarence John Hobkirk  Essex Regiment
Major and Brevet Colonel Archibald Fraser Home  Hussars
Major The Hon. Neville Albert Hood  Royal Artillery
Major and Brevet Lieutenant-Colonel The Hon. Christian Malise Hore-Ruthven  Royal Highlanders
Colonel Wilfred Edward Hudleston  Army Medical Service
Major Hugh Moore Hutchinson  Connaught Rangers
Brevet Lieutenant-Colonel Alfred Ernest Irvine  Durham Light Infantry
Major and Brevet Lieutenant-Colonel Evan Maclean Jack  Royal Engineers Brevet 
Lieutenant-Colonel John Darnley Ingles  Devonshire Regiment
Temp and Hon. Major Charles George Jarvis  Royal Army Medical Corps
Major and Brevet Colonel George Napier Johnston  Royal Artillery
Lieutenant-Colonel and Brevet Colonel Geoffrey Chicheley Kemp  Royal Engineers
Major and Brevet Lieutenant-Colonel Henry Brewster Percy Lion Kennedy  King's Royal Rifle Corps
Major and Brevet Lieutenant-Colonel John Kennedy  Argyll & Sutherland Highlanders
Lieutenant-Colonel and Brevet Colonel Carleton Hooper Morrison Kirkwood  Wiltshire Regiment
Colonel Edward Parry Lambert 
Lieutenant-Colonel Penton Shakespear Lowis  Royal Garrison Artillery
Major and Brevet Lieutenant Colonel Cuthbert Henry Tindall Lucas  Royal Berkshire Regiment
Major and Brevet Lieutenant-Colonel Russell Mortimer Luckock, Royal Lancaster Regiment
Temp Lieutenant-Colonel David Lyell  Royal Engineers
Major and Brevet Lieutenant-Colonel Conwyn Mansel-Jones  West Yorkshire Regiment
Major and Brevet Lieutenant-Colonel Gerald Hamilton Martin  King's Royal Rifle Corps
Major and Brevet Lieutenant-Colonel Arthur Edward McNamara  Royal West Surrey Regiment
Major Godfrey Meynell, Shropshire Light Infantry
Major Cecil Buckley Morgan  Durham Light Infantry
Lieutenant-Colonel Edward Maudsley Morphew  Royal Army Medical Corps
Lieutenant-Colonel Frederick Blundell Moss-Blundell  Royal Field Artillery
Major and Brevet Lieutenant-Colonel Henry Needham  Gloucestershire Regiment
Major and Brevet Lieutenant-Colonel Octavius Henry Lothian Nicholson  West Yorkshire Regiment
Major and Brevet Lieutenant-Colonel Walter Norris Nicholson  Suffolk Regiment
Major and Brevet Lieutenant-Colonel George de la Poer Beresford Pakenham  Border Regiment
Lieutenant-Colonel Cyril Eustace Palmer  Royal Artillery
Colonel Thomas Tait Pitman 
Major George Chambers Pollard  Royal Engineers
Major and Brevet Lieutenant-Colonel Cyril Lachlan Porter  East Kent Regiment
Major Edmund Thurlow Potts  Royal Army Medical Corps
Major and Brevet Lieutenant-Colonel George Arthur Paget Rennie  King's Royal Rifle Corps
Temp Colonel Owen William Richards  Royal Army Medical Corps
Temp Captain Wilfrid Stanley Richmond, Royal Engineers
Major and Brevet Lieutenant-Colonel Arthur Murray Ross  West Yorkshire Regiment 
Colonel Cecil Henry de Rougemont 
Major and Brevet Lieutenant-Colonel Eugene Ryan  Royal Army Medical Corps
Major and Brevet Lieutenant-Colonel Jonathan William Shirley Sewell, RTE
Major Basil Heron Shaw-Stewart  Royal Field Artillery
Lieutenant-Colonel John Joseph Shute  Liverpool Regiment
Major Maurice Sinclair  Royal Army Medical Corps
Captain and Brevet Lieutenant Colonel The Hon. Ferdinand Charles Stanley  Grenadier Guards
Major William Lawrence Steele, Royal Army Medical Corps
Lieutenant-Colonel and Brevet Colonel Edward Hall Stevenson  Royal Artillery
Major and Brevet Lieutenant-Colonel Percy Vere Powys Stone  Norfolk Regiment
Lieutenant-Colonel Clement Arthur Sykes  Royal Artillery
Major and Brevet Lieutenant-Colonel Ernest Napper Tandy  Royal Artillery
Major and Brevet Lieutenant-Colonel Reginald O'Bryan Taylor  Indian Cavalry
Major and Brevet Lieutenant-Colonel Roger Stephen Tempest  Scots Guards
Lieutenant-Colonel Albert George Thompson  Royal Army Medical Corps
Major and Brevet Lieutenant-Colonel Richard Lovell Brereton Thompson  Royal Engineers
Colonel William David Thomson, Indian Army
Lieutenant-Colonel Noel Arbuthnot Thomson  Seaforth Highlanders
Major Leslie Heber Thornton  Rifle Brigade
Major Hew Wakeman Tompson, Hampshire Regiment
Lieutenant-Colonel George Strangways Tovey  Royal Artillery
Temp Lieutenant-Colonel Ralph Brunton Umfreville  Gloucestershire Regiment
Major and Brevet Lieutenant-Colonel Valentine Vivian  Grenadier Guards
Major and Brevet Lieutenant-Colonel Cyril Mosley Wagstaff  Royal Engineers
Major and Brevet Lieutenant-Colonel Henry Alexander Walker  Royal Fusiliers
Major and Brevet Lieutenant-Colonel Richard Knox Walsh  Royal Scots Fusiliers
Lieutenant-Colonel Edward Charles Walthall Delves Walthall  Royal Artillery
Lieutenant-Colonel Philip Wheatley  Royal Artillery
Major and Brevet Lieutenant-Colonel Leonard Lane Wheatley  Argyll & Sutherland Highlanders
Major and Brevet Lieutenant-Colonel Adrian Carton de Wiart  Dragoon Guards
Colonel Herbert William Wilberforce 
Colonel Frederick Maurice Wilson 
Captain Charles Rupert Peter Winser  late Royal Lancaster Regiment
Colonel John Watkins Yardley 

Canadian Force
Lieutenant-Colonel Arthur Henry Bell  Alberta Regiment
Lieutenant-Colonel Charles Edward Bent  Central Ontario Regiment
Major James Sutherland Brown  Royal Canadian Regiment
Lieutenant-Colonel Raymond Brutinel  Mounted Machine Gun Corps
Lieutenant-Colonel William Hew Clark-Kennedy  Quebec Regiment
Colonel John Munro Elder, Canadian Army Medical Corps
Lieutenant-Colonel William Waring Primrose Gibsone  Royal Canadian Regiment
Major Andrew Lorne Hamilton, Canadian Army Pay Corps
Temp Brigadier-General William Birchall Macaulay King  Field Artillery
Lieutenant-Colonel George Eric McCraig  Quebec Regiment
Lieutenant-Colonel The Hon. Angus McDonnell, Railways Troops
Colonel Arthur Evans Snell  Canadian Army Medical Corps
Lieutenant-Colonel Thomas-Louis Tremblay  Quebec Regiment

Australian Force
Colonel James Harold Cannan  Infantry
Colonel Thomas Henry Dodds  Corps Headquarters
Lieutenant-Colonel James Murdoch Archer Durrant  Aust. General List
Lieutenant-Colonel Charles Hazell Elliott  Infantry
Colonel Robert Beveridge Huxtable  Army Medical Corps
Lieutenant-Colonel Daniel Aston Luxton  Infantry
Lieutenant-Colonel Terence Patrick McSharry  Infantry
Lieutenant-Colonel Stanley Lyndall Milligan  Australian General List
Lieutenant-Colonel George Francis Murphy  Infantry
Lieutenant-Colonel Edmund James Houghton Nicholson  Engineers
Colonel John Paton  Infantry
Lieutenant-Colonel John Henry Peck  Infantry
Colonel William Livingstone Hatchwell Sinclair-Burgess  Artillery
Lieutenant-Colonel Horace George Viney  Australian General List
Lieutenant-Colonel Maurice Wilder-Neligan  Infantry

New Zealand Force
Lieutenant-Colonel Herbert Ernest Hart  Wellington Regiment
Lieutenant-Colonel Charles William Melvill  Staff Corps

The Most Eminent Order of the Indian Empire

Knight Grand Commander (GCIE)
His Highness Raja Sri Rama Varma, Raja of Cochin, Madras
Sir Frederick William Duke  Member of the Council of the Secretary of State for India

Knight Commander (KCIE)
Thakur Sahib Lakhaji Raj Bawaji Raj, Thakur Sahib of Rajkot Kathiawar, Bombay
Lieutenant-Colonel Walter James Buchanan  Indian Medical Service, Inspector-General of Prisons, Bengal
Honorary Lieutenant-Colonel Raja Jai Chand  of Lambagaon, Punjab
Rear-Admiral Drury St Aubyn Wake  late Senior Naval Officer, Persian Gulf

Companion (CIE)
A. V. Venkataramana Iyer, Assistant Secretary to the Government of India, Finance Department
Francis William Bain, Indian Educational Service, Principal, Deccan College, Bombay
Charles Alfred Barber, Agricultural Service, Imperial Sugarcane Expert, Madras
Major and Brevet Lieutenant-Colonel Frederick Adolphus Fleming Barnardo  Indian Medical Service, Deputy Assistant Director of Medical Services (Distribution), Bombay
Roderick Korneli Biernacki  Locomotive Superintendent, North-Western State Railway
Colonel Alfred Joseph Caruana, Indian Army, Judge Advocate-General in India
Khan Bahadur Nawab Saiyid Nawab Ali Chaudhuri, Zamindar, Dhanbari, Mymensingh, Bengal
George Herman Collier, Director-General of Stores, India Office
John Desmond, Executive Engineer, Public Works Department, Nagpur, Central Provinces
Claude Fraser de la Fosse, Indian Educational Service, Director of Public Instruction, United Provinces, and a Member of the Council of the Lieutenant-Governor for making Laws and Regulations
Thomas Emerson, Indian Civil Service, Collector of Tipperah, Bengal
Jyotsna Nath Ghosal, Indian Civil Service, Collector of Kaira, Bombay
John Robertson Henderson  Superintendent, Government Museum, and Principal Librarian, Connemara Public Library, Madras
Major Davis Heron  Indian Medical Service, Medical Officer, Seistan Consulate, and His Britannic Majesty's Vice-Consul for Seistan and Kain
William Frederick Holms, Public Works Department, Chief Engineer, Irrigation Works, Punjab
Henry Raikes Alexander Irwin, Singell Tea Estate, Darjeeling, Bengal
John Ernest Jackson, Chief Auditor, Bombay, Baroda, and Central India Railway, Bombay
Sardar Bahadur Farman Ali Khan, Adjutant-General, Kashmir State Army
Qadir Baksh Khan, Lieutenant-Colonel Bahadur Commandant, 1st Company, Maler Kotla Imperial Service Sappers, Punjab
Arthur Cecil McWatters  Indian Civil Service, Controller (Hides and Wool), Indian Munitions Board
Lieutenant-Colonel Ernest Alan Robert Newman  Indian Medical Service, Civil Surgeon, and Superintendent, Medical School, Dacca, Bengal
Alan William Pirn, Indian Civil Service, Magistrate and Collector of Benares
Colonel Robert Montagu Poore  British Service, commanding Jhansi Brigade
George Rainy, Indian Civil Service, Deputy Secretary to the Government of India, Finance Department
Major Edward Tillotson Rich, Royal Engineers, Survey of India
Edward Charles Ryland, Indian Police, Deputy Inspector-General of Police, lately Officiating Inspector-General of Police, Bihar and Orissa
Bernhard Martin Samuelson, Chief Engineer and Officiating Joint Secretary, Public Works Department, Burma
Sardar Bahadur Gurnam Singh, Home Secretary to His Highness the Maharaja and General of State Forces of Patiala, Punjab
Kunwar Unkar Singh, of Patiala, Kotah State, General Superintendent of the Kotah State Police, Rajputana
Raja Ratan Sen Singh, of Bansi, son of Raja Ram Singh, District Basti, United Provinces
Lieutenant-Colonel Herbert Austen Smith, Indian Medical Service, Surgeon to His Excellency the Viceroy of India
Colonel Robert George Strange, British Service, commanding Presidency Brigade
Lieutenant-Colonel Cyril Frank Templer  Director-General, Army Remount Department
Capt. Seymour Douglas Vale, Royal Indian Marine, Principal Port Officer and Marine Transport Officer, Rangoon
Nasarwanji Navroji Wadia, Mill-owner and Merchant, Bombay
Major George Henry Willis  Royal Engineers, Mint Master, Bombay

In recognition of the meritorious services in connection with operations on the Indian Frontier (To date from 1 January 1918) —

Lieutenant-Colonel Thomas Gordon Blois-Johnson 
Colonel Arthur Blanshard Hawley Drew
Colonel Patrick Hehir  Indian Medical Service
Colonel Robert Fox Sorsbie

The Royal Victorian Order

Knight Grand Cross of the Royal Victorian Order (GCVO)
Lieutenant-General Sir Alfred Keogh 
Colonel Sir Walter Roper Lawrence 
Sir Edward John Poynter  President of the Royal Academy

Knight Commander of the Royal Victorian Order (KCVO)
Lord Marcus de la Poer Beresford 
Capt. Thomas Dacres Butler 
Sir Luke Fildes, Royal Artillery
William Llewellyn 
Sir Alan Reeve Manby 
Lieutenant-Colonel Sir Edward Scott Worthington  Royal Army Medical Corps

Commander of the Royal Victorian Order (CVO)
Lieutenant-Colonel The Hon. Alwyn Henry Fulke Greville 
Sir Claud Schuster
Harry Fagg Batterbee

Member of the Royal Victorian Order, 4th class (MVO)
Arthur Sheppard
Charles Percival White

Member of the Royal Victorian Order, 5th class (MVO)
William Deuchar
Lieutenant Charles Edward Stretton, Royal Artillery

The Most Excellent Order of the British Empire

Dame Grand Cross of the Order of the British Empire (GBE)
Her Highness Princess Christian  Member of the Council of the British Red Cross Society and of the Joint War Committee of the British Red Cross Society and the Order of St. John of Jerusalem in England
Her Royal Highness Princess Louise, Duchess of Argyll  Member of the Council and President of the Kensington Branch of the British Red Cross Society
Her Highness Princess Helena Victoria  Lady President of the Young Men's Christian Association and President of the Women's Auxiliary of the Young Men's Christian Association for France
Ethel Hope Becher  Matron-in-Chief, Queen Alexandra's Imperial Military Nursing Service
Mary Ethel, Viscountess Harcourt — Honorary Secretary, American Women's War Relief Fund
Agnes Weston  Founder of the Royal Sailors' Rests at Naval Ports
Charlotte Josephine, Marchioness of Winchester — President of the Hampshire Branch of the British Red Cross Society; Member of the Voluntary Aid Detachment Advisory Committee and of the Voluntary Aid Detachment Selection Board

Knight Grand Cross of the Order of the British Empire (GBE)
Arthur David Brooks  Lord Mayor of Birmingham
Sir   Member of the Council of the British Red Cross Society and of the Joint War Committee of the British Red Cross Society and the Order of St. John of Jerusalem in England; Member of the Voluntary Aid Detachment Advisory Committee and of the Voluntary Aid Detachment Selection Board
Sir Charles Blair Gordon  Vice-Chairman of the British War Mission to the United States of America
The Right Hon. Robert George Windsor-Clive, Earl of Plymouth  Sub-Prior of the Order of St. John of Jerusalem in England; Member of the Joint War Committee of the British Red Cross Society and the Order of St. John of Jerusalem in England
The Very Reverend Thomas Banks Strong  Dean of Christ Church, Oxford; late Vice-Chancellor of the University of Oxford

Dame Commander of the Order of the British Empire (DBE)

Katharine Marjory, Duchess of Atholl — President, Perthshire Branch, British Red Cross Society
Florence Eveleen Eleanore, Lady Bell — President, North Riding of Yorkshire Branch, British Red Cross Society
The Hon. Maud Elizabeth Bevan — President of the Hertfordshire Branch, British Red Cross Society; Commandant, Royston Auxiliary Hospital
Augusta Mary Monica, Marchioness of Bute — Donor and Commandant, Bute House Naval Hospital, Rothesay. 
Anna Maria, Lady Donner — Vice-President, Fallowfield Division, British Red Cross Society; Organiser of Fairview Auxiliary Hospital, Fallowfield
Clarissa Reid — President of the Workers Committee, and Honorary Secretary, Anglo-South American Central Depot
Aileen Mary, Countess Roberts — Honorary Secretary, Officers' Families Fund; founder of the Countess Roberts Field Glass Fund
Mary Dorothea, Countess Waldegrave — Deputy President, Somersetshire Branch, British Red Cross Society

Knight Commander of the Order of the British Empire (KBE)
Colonel Henry Edward Fane Goold-Adams  Late Controller, Munitions Inventions Department
John Archer — Chairman of the Advisory Committee (Customs and Excise) on Wines and Spirits
Captain Henry Dennis Readett-Bayley  Organiser of the Dennis Bayley Fund for the transport of wounded
Arthur Shirley Benn  Chairman, Belgian Relief Committee
Harry Brittain — Founder of the American Officers' Club
Brigadier-General Joseph Aloysius Byrne  Inspector-General, Royal Irish Constabulary
Thomas Henry Hall Caine, Novelist, dramatist, short story writer, poet and critic
Theodore Gervase Chambers — Controller, National War Savings Committee
Cyril Stephen Cobb  Late Chairman, London County Council
Robert Lowden Connell — Deputy Director of Salvage
Edward Marriott Cooke  Chairman of the Board of Control
Horace Darwin  Chairman of the Cambridge Scientific Instrument Company, Ltd. Member of the Munitions Inventions Department Panel
John Duthie  Senior Assistant Director-General of Voluntary Organisations
John Esplen — Senior Partner in the firm of Messrs. Esplen, Sons, & Swainston, Ltd., Naval Architects
John Ferguson — Assistant to the Surveyor-General of Supply, War Office
Gilbert Francis Garnsey — Joint Controller of Munitions Accounts
Lieutenant-Colonel Albert George Hadcock  Managing Director, Sir W. G. Armstrong Whitworth & Company, Ltd.
Cecil Reeves Harrison — Director, Messrs. Harrison & Sons, Printers
Sydney Herbert Holcroft Henn — Director of Army Priority
Osborn George Holmden  Director of the Inter-Allied Chartering Executive
Alexander Cruikshank Houston  Director of Water Examinations, Metropolitan Water Board
Henry Japp  Member of the British War Mission to the-United States of America
Walter Samuel Kinnear — Chairman of the Navy and Army Insurance Fund; Deputy Chairman of the National Health Insurance Commission (Ireland)
Hugh Gwynne Levick — Representative of the Treasury on the London Exchange Committee
Bertram Lewis Lima — Ministry of Information
Joseph Lowrey — Secretary, London Salvage Association
John Lumsden  Vice-Chairman of Joint Voluntary Aid Detachment Committee, Ireland
Harry Duncan McGowan — Managing Director of Nobel's Explosives Co., Ltd.
William Warrender Mackenzie  A Chairman of the Committee on Production
Sigismund Ferdinand Mendl — Member of the Royal Commission on Wheat Supplies
Thomas Hudson Middleton  Deputy Director-General, Food Production Department, Board of Agriculture
Colonel Sir Frederic Lewis Nathan — Chairman, Standing Committee on the Causes of Explosions at Government and Controlled Factories, Ministry of Munitions; Chairman, Advisory Committee on Alcohol Supplies for War Purposes
Adam Nimmo — President of the Mining Association of Great Britain; Chairman of the Board of Trade Committee on the Coal Trade after the War; Member of the Central Coal and Coke Supplies Committee
Major William Orpen 
Admiral Sir Richard Henry Peirse  Naval Member of the Central Committee of the Board of Invention and Research
Percival Lea Dewhurst Perry  Director of Mechanical Warfare, Ministry of Munitions
Lindsay Byron Peters — Chairman, Engineer and Works Supply Committee, War Office
James William Restler — Chairman of the Metropolitan Munitions Committee; Chief Engineer, Metropolitan Water Board
Lieutenant-Colonel Walrond Arthur Frank Sinclair — Controller of Registration, Ministry of National Service; Director of National Service for the London Region
Allan MacGregor Smith — Chairman of the Management Committee of the Engineering Employers Federation
Harris Spencer  Chairman of the Birmingham Board of Management, Ministry of Munitions; Chairman of the Midland Employers' Federation
Howard Handley Spicer — Managing Director, Messrs. James Spicer & Sons, Limited; Technical Adviser to the War Office
Lieutenant-Colonel Albert Stern  Liaison Officer between British and United States Tanks Department; late Director-General of Mechanical Warfare, Ministry of Munitions
Colonel Robert King Stewart — Convener of the County of Lanark
Robert Fox-Symons  Head of Auxiliary Hospitals Department, British Red Cross Society and Order of St. John of Jerusalem 
James Taggart, Lord Provost of Aberdeen; Chairman of the Aberdeen Munitions Board of Management
His Honour Judge William Francis Kyffin Taylor — Judge of the Liverpool Court of Passage
Colonel Sir Courtauld Thomson  Chief British Red Cross Commissioner for Malta and the Near East
William Mitchell-Thomson  Director of the Restriction of Enemy Supplies Department
John Edward Thornycroft — Director, Messrs. John I. Thornycroft & Company., Ltd.
Seymour Biscoe Tritton — Partner, Messrs. Rendel, Palmer & Tritton, Consulting Engineers
William Ellis Hume-Williams  Liaison Officer between the War Trade Department and the Commission Internationale de Ravitaillement; late British Red Cross Commissioner, Petrograd; Member of the Central Prisoners of War Committee
Thomas Fleming Wilson  Clerk of the Peace for the City of Glasgow; Clerk to the General Munitions of War Tribunal for Scotland, and to the Local Tribunal for Glasgow; Agent of HM Procurator-General, and of the Treasury Solicitor in Glasgow

India
Maharaja Bahadur Sir Bhagwati Prasad Singh  Taluqdar of Balrampur, District Gonda, United Provinces
Lieutenant-Colonel Frank Popham Young  Indian Army Commissioner, Rawalpindi Division, Punjab
Maharaja Bahadur Sir Rameshwar Singh  of Darbhanga. Landholder, Bihar and Orissa
Pirajirao Bapu Sahib Ghatge  Chief of Kagal (senior branch), Kolhapur, Bombay

Egypt and the Sudan
Colonel George Samuel Abercrombie Harvey Pasha  Head of Police and Provost Marshal of Cairo

Commander of the Order of the British Empire (CBE)
Colonel Anthony John Abdy  Assistant Military Secretary, Southern Command
Laura Elizabeth, Baroness Aberconway — Donor and Administrator, Annexe to King Edward VII's Hospital
James Adam  National War Aims Committee
Thomas Adams  Chairman, South-East Scotland Joint Committee, Ministry of Pensions
Samuel John Henry Wallis Allin — Actuary, National Health Insurance Joint Committee
Captain Francis Arthur Lavington Andrews  King's Harbour Master, Malta
Augustus Gordon Grant Asher — County Clerk of Midlothian, and Clerk of Lieutenancy; Secretary to the Association of Scottish County Councils
Gertrude Mary Bailey
Captain George Edward Bairnsfather  Divisional Naval Transport Officer, Dover
Edward Charles Cyril Baly  Professor of Chemistry, Liverpool University; Deputy Inspector of High Explosives, Liverpool Area
Joseph Barcroft  Superintendent of Physiological Investigations, Chemical Warfare Department, Ministry of Munitions
Charles Coupar Barrie — Commercial Adviser to Naval Assistant, Ministry of Shipping
Rose Mabel Beatty — Commandant, Green Cross Society
Conrad Beck — President, British Optical Instrument Manufacturers' Association; Chairman and Managing Director, Messrs. R. and J. Beck, Limited
The Hon. Muriel Helen Florence Beckett — Donor and Administrator of Hospital for Officers, 34, Grosvenor Street, London
Major John Hay Beith 
Major Ernest Albert Belcher — Director of Vegetable Supplies, Ministry of Food
Robert Bell — North Eastern Railway Company
Lieutenant-Colonel Henry Vere Fane Benet — For services in Russia
Ernest John Pickstone Benn — Chairman (unpaid) of the Trade Organization Commissioners, Ministry of Reconstruction
Colonel Frank Benson — Assistant Managing Director, Navy and Army Canteen Board
The Right Reverend Monsignor Manuel John, Bishop Bidwell — Secretary to His Eminence Cardinal Bourne
Lieutenant-Colonel Harry Woodburn Blaylock — Canadian Red Cross Commissioner, France
Herbert Holford Bottomley — Director of Special Publicity, War Loan Campaign
Captain Sir Harold Edwin Boulton  Queen Mary's Hostel for Nurses
William Walter Bradfield — Director and Manager, Marconi Company
The Hon. Florence Marshall Brooks — Donor and Administrator, Portal Auxiliary Hospital, Tarporley, Cheshire
W. Brown  Chairman of Directors, Messrs. W. Simons & Co.
Jeffrey Browning  Assistant Secretary, Board of Customs and Excise
Georgina Grenfell Buckler — Enquiry Department for Wounded and Missing, British Red Cross Society
William Buckley — Chairman, North Wales Munitions Board of Management
Joseph Burn — Member of the National War Savings Committee
Sir Henry Parsall Burt  Representing India Office on Ministry of Munitions Priority Committee
Sir Hector Clare Cameron  Red Cross Commissioner for Western District of Scotland
George Wallace Carter, National War Aims Committee
Brigadier-General James Eales Gaunter  Brigadier-General in charge of Administration, Western Command
Colonel Sir Thomas Sturmy Cave  Chairman, Young Men's Christian Association; National War Emergency Committee
Alfred Chandler — General Manager and Secretary, Mersey Docks and Harbour Board, Liverpool
Anastasia, Lady Cheetham — Commandant, Voluntary Aid Detachment 2, Cairo
Robert Chisholm — Superintendent of Ordnance Factories, Messrs. William Beardmore and Company., Ltd.
Colonel Arthur Gillespie Churchill  Late Chief Cable Censor
George Jackson Churchward — Chief Mechanical Engineer, Great Western Railway
John Harold Clapham  Deputy Director, Industrial (War Enquiries) Branch, Board of Trade; Member of the Industries Committee of the War Priorities Committee
Ernest Clark — Deputy Chief Inspector of Taxes, Inland Revenue Department
Joseph Percival Clarke — Deputy Director of Inland Waterways and Docks, War Office
Sir William Edwin Clegg  Chairman, Sheffield Local Munitions Tribunal
David Wilson Coates — Chief Accountant, Financial Branch, Coal Mines Department, Board of Trade
Herbert Mansfield Cobb — Honorary Adviser to the War Office and Ministry of Munitions on Land Questions
William Cocks — Managing Director, Channel Dry Docks Company, Cardiff
William Richard Codling  Deputy Controller, HM Stationery Office
Colonel Herbert Covington Cole — Chief Valuer and Compensation Officer, Land Directorate, War Office
Major Alfred Stephen Collard — Director of Billeting and Commandant of Orderlies, British Red Cross Commission, France
Colonel Lord Douglas James Cecil Compton — For services with the British Expeditionary Force, France
James Alexander Cooper  Principal Clerk (temporary), Finance Department, War Office
Colonel Fiennes Stanley Wykeham Cornwallis  Chairman, Kent War Agricultural Executive Committee
Colonel Edmund Arthur Waldegrave Courtney  Director of Requisition Services, British Expeditionary Force, France
Thomas Cox  National War Aims Committee
Major Algernon Tudor-Craig — Secretary of the Incorporated Soldiers' and Sailors' Help Society
John Craig — Managing Director, Messrs. David Colville & Sons, Limited
Brigadier-General Sir Robert Cranston 
Mary Crowdy — Deputy Principal Commandant of Voluntary Aid Detachments in France
David Charles Cummings — Assistant Industrial Commissioner, Ministry of Labour
Edith Bassett Curzon — Donor and Organiser, Officers' Hospital, Watermouth Castle, Berrynarbor, North Devonshire
Thomas Dally — Superintendent of Naval Construction, Admiralty
Muriel Bromley Davenport — Vice-chairman of the Hove War Hospital Supply Depots
Henry Samuel Denny — Superintendent at one of HM Factories, Ministry of Munitions
Captain Maurice Edward Denny — Late Deputy Director of Designs, Department of the Controller-General for Merchant Shipbuilding, Admiralty
Henry Newton Dickson  Professor of Geography, University College, Reading; Head of Geographical Section, Naval Intelligence Division, Admiralty
Harold Baily Dixon  Professor of Chemistry, Manchester University
Alfred Dobrée — Member, Ordnance Committee, Ministry of Munitions
Helen, Lady Dodds — Head of Prisoners of War Fund, British Red Cross Society
Campbell Dodgson — Keeper of Prints and Drawings, British Museum
Colonel William Edward Donohue — Inspector of Mechanical Transport, Eastern Theatres of Operations
Brevet Colonel Henry Dowrish Drake — Royal Military Academy
Edith Florence, Lady Grant-Duff — Founder and Organiser of the Bread Bureau for Prisoners of War
John Whelan Dulanty — Assistant-Secretary (Establishment Department), Ministry of Munitions
Albert Eddison — General Manager, Messrs. Kynoch, Limited
John Owain Evans
Major Arthur Stewart Eve  Resident Director of Research, Admiralty Experimental Station, Parkeston
The Hon. Muriel Fitzroy — Head of General Service Section, Joint Women's Voluntary Aid Detachment Department, British Red Cross Society
Vice-Admiral Henry Louis Fleet — County Director, Auxiliary Hospitals & Voluntary Aid Detachments, Berkshire
Brigadier-General Albert Fletcher  Director of Air Quarter Master Services, Air Ministry
William Fraser — Managing Director, Pumpherston Oil Company, Ltd.
Philip Horace Freeman — Honorary Secretary, Business Committee, The Marchioness of Lansdowne Officers' Families' Fund
Myra Maclndoe Gibson— Honorary Organiser & General Manager, Central Surgical Depot, Queen Mary's Needlework Guild
Alexander Goddard — Joint Secretary of Lord Selborne's Agricultural Policy Sub-Committee of the Ministry of Reconstruction
Colonel Robert Edmund Golightly 
Edward Carter Kersey Gonner  Professor of Economic Science, Liverpool University; Director of Statistics, Ministry of Food
Henry Goode, Ministry of Information
Gladys Sheffield Hamilton-Grace — Founder and Joint Honorary Secretary, Mesopotamia Comforts Fund
Colonel Samuel Charles Norton Grant 
John Ernest Greaves — His Majesty's Lieutenant for the County of Caernarvonshire; Chairman, Carnarvonshire Appeal Tribunal
Captain John Alfred Henderson Green — County Director, Auxiliary Hospitals and Voluntary Aid DetachmentS, Nottinghamshire
His Honour Judge Francis John Greenwell — Joint Chairman, Durham Appeal Tribunal
Robert Morrell Greenwood — Assistant, Treasury Solicitor's Department, Law Courts Branch
Major John Ronald Greg — Director, Metropolitan Carriage, Wagon and Finance Co., Ltd.
Lilian Decima Moore-Guggisberg — Honorary Secretary, British Army and Navy Leave Club, Paris
Elinor Marie Jessie Halle — Surgical Requisites Branch, Queen Mary's Needlework Guild
Basil Howard Alers Hankey — County Director, Auxiliary Hospitals and Voluntary Aid Detachments, Wiltshire
Captain Francis Hugh George Hercy  Voluntary worker on recruiting duties, Ministry of National Service
Sydney George Higgins — Assistant Accountant-General (unpaid), Ministry of Shipping
Alfred John Hill — Chief Mechanical Engineer, Great Eastern Railway
Brevet Lieutenant-Colonel Geoffrey Lennard Hoare — General Staff Officer, 2nd Grade, War Office
William John Hocking — First Assistant Superintendent, Operative Department, and Librarian and Curator of the Museum, Royal Mint
Mary Eleanor Gwynne Holford — Founder of Queen Mary's Auxiliary Hospital for Limbless Soldiers, Roehampton
Howard Hollingsworth — Member of Executive Committee of the King Albert's Hospitals Committee
Henry Charles Herman Hawker Houndle  Chief Clerk, Local Government Board
Major Stephen Goodwin Howard  Chairman, Cambridgeshire Appeal Tribunal
Harry Kynoch Hudson — Late Red Cross Commissioner at Salonika, and subsequently in Roumania
James Huggett — Financial Adviser, Egyptian Expeditionary Force
Evan Hughes — Director of Organisation, National War Savings Committee
Colonel John Arthur Hughes  County Director, Auxiliary Hospitals and Voluntary Aid Detachments, Glamorganshire
Sydney Herbert George Hughes — Accountant, National Health Insurance Commission (England)
Albert Hunt — Joint Manager, Union Castle Mail Steamship Co., Ltd.
Edward Mauger Iliffe — Controller, Machine Tool Department, Ministry of Munitions
Sir Henry Mather Jackson  Chairman, Monmouthshire Appeal Tribunal
Alfred Henry James — Chairman of the Training Subcommittee of the Joint Committee of the West Midland Area
Engineer-Captain William Henry James  Engineering Manager, Devonport Dockyard
Brigadier-General Francis Conway Jenkins — Director of Parks and Depots, Air Ministry
Mark Webster Jenkinson — Controller of Factory Accounts and Factory Costs, Ministry of Munitions
Rear-Admiral Edmund Purefoy Ellis Jervoise — Captain of Royal Naval College, Greenwich; Manager of the Seaman's Dreadnought Hospital
Henry Langhorne Johnson — Honorary Chief Commissioner for France and Flanders, Church Army
William John Jones — Assistant Controller, Iron and Steel Department, Ministry of Munitions
Captain Francis L'Estrange Joseph — Assistant Secretary, Ministry of National Service
William Keene  Late His Britannic Majesty's Consul-General, Genoa
Frank Knowles, War Office Meat Expert
Harry Philip Parnell Lane  Chief Constable of Lancashire
Charles Russell Lang — Joint Managing Director, Messrs. G. & J. Weir, Ltd., Cathcart
Major-General Henry Herbert Lee 
Thomas Morison Legge  Chief Medical Inspector of Factories
Acting Paymaster-in-Chief Frank Lenn  In charge of the Central Pay Office of the Royal Naval Air Service
Marion Eva Lethbridge — Commandant of General Service Voluntary Aid Detachments in France
William Malesbury Letts — Managing Director, Crossley Motors, Limited
Charles Ashton Lister — Member, West of England Munition Board of Management; Member, Board of Management Reconstruction Advisory Panel
Ernest Knightley Little — County Director, Auxiliary Hospitals an Voluntary Aid Detachments, Warwickshire
Edward William Lucas — Managing Director, Messrs. Bell, Hills Lucas, Limited
Emma Maud McCarthy  Matron-in-Chief, Queen Alexandra's Imperial Military Nursing Service
Major The Rev. John Howard MacDonald  Assistant Director of Chaplain Services, Canadian Forces
Charles John Graham MacGuckin — General Manager, Ammunition Department, Messrs. Sir W. G. Armstrong Whitworth & Company., Ltd.
Robert John MacKay — Principal Clerk — Secretary's Office, General Post Office
Colonel John Dolben Mackworth — Deputy-Director of Balloons, Air Ministry
Colonel William Richard James McLean  Assistant Adjutant-General — Inspecting Officer of the Transport Workers' Battalions
Lieutenant-Colonel William McLellan 
Arnold Duncan McNair — Production Branch, Coal Mines Department, Board of Trade
Sydney Mager — Chief Inspector, Food Production Department
Lawrence Margerison — Director of Administration of Local War Savings Committees
Herbert Marriott — Chief Goods Manager, Lancashire and Yorkshire Railway
Colonel William Marsh  County Director, Auxiliary Hospitals and Voluntary Aid Detachments, Somersetshire
Captain George Walter Howard Martin  Divisional Naval Transport Officer, Devonport
Norman Melland — War Trade Department
Holberry Mensforth — General Works Manager, British Westinghouse Electric & Manufacturing Co., Ltd.; Member, Manchester Cooperative Munitions Board of Management, and Member Manchester National Shell Factory Board of Management
John Alexander Milne — Chairman of the Linen and Silk Committee of the War Trade Board; Member of the Flax Control Board, War Trade Department
Lieutenant-Colonel Seaburne Godfrey Arthur May Moens — Red Cross Commissioner, Mesopotamia
Lieutenant-Colonel John Mitchell Moncrieff — Royal Engineers. Late Director of Engineering Work, Department of the Controller-General for Merchant Shipbuilding, Admiralty
Major Charles Babington Smith Monfries  Finance Secretary to the Commission Internationale de Ravitaillement
Caroline Mary Sybil Eyres Monsell — Donor and Administrator, Annexe to King Edward VII's Hospital
Lieutenant-Colonel Thomas Henry Morris  Chairman, West Riding Standing Joint Committee
John Fitzgerald Moylan — Senior Clerk, Home Office
Hugh Murray  Head of the Home Grown Timber Branch, Timber Supplies Department, Board of Trade
George Howard Nash — Chief Engineer, Western Electric Company
John Newlands  Controller of the Central Telegraph Office, General Post Office
Brigadier-General John Sanctuary Nicholson  For services with the British Expeditionary Force in France
Henry Norris — Dock and Warehouse Manager, Port of London Authority
Robert Frederick Norton  Legal Adviser to the Foreign Trade Department
Alfred Noyes
Thomas Downham Nuttall — Chairman, Bury Munitions Board of Management
Charles Roger Orr — Late Chairman, Dundee Munitions Board of Management
John Stewart Oxley — General Inspector, Local Government Board
Frederick Handley Page — Managing Director, Messrs. Handley Page, Limited
William Morton Page — Assistant Secretary (Requirements and Statistics Department), Ministry of Munitions
Major Eden Wilberforce Paget — Director of Transport, British Red Cross Commission, France
Colonel William Henry Parkes  Director of Medical Services, New Zealand Expeditionary Force
Engineer-Captain William Roskilly Parsons 
Colonel Denis Paul  Principal Inspector of Ordnance Machinery, British Expeditionary Force, France
Sylvia May Payne  Commandant and Medical Officer in Charge, Torquay Auxiliary Hospital
John Penoyre
Arthur Peters  National War Aims Committee
Thomas William Phillips — Acting Assistant Director, Employment Department, Ministry, of Labour
Lieutenant-Colonel Henry Philip Picot — British Representative, Prisoners of War, Switzerland
Edmund Potter — Assistant Solicitor to the Board of Trade
Colonel James Leslie Grove Powell 
Colonel William Price  Director of Army Postal Services, British Expeditionary Force, France
Sir Henry Edward Edleston Procter — Acting Honorary Treasurer, Young Men's Christian Association
Granville George, Baron Radstock — Young Men's Christian Association, Egypt
Robert Sangster Rait — Professor of Scottish History and Literature, Glasgow University
Albion Henry Herbert Richardson  Chairman of Law Society Section of London Appeal Tribunal
Cecil Guy Ridley — Headquarters Staff, Metropolitan Special Constabulary
Lieutenant-Colonel Struan Gordon Robertson — Officer in Charge of Estates Branch, Overseas Military Forces of Canada
Andrew Robinson  Principal Surveyor, Board of Public Works, Ireland
Edith Louise Julie, Lady Rogers — Voluntary Aid Detachment, Cairo
Thomas Emerson Ruddock — Head of Norwegian Section, Ministry of Shipping
Charles Ryall  Assessor in Charge, London Medical Assessors for Examination of Men for Military Service
Colonel Charles Montgomery Ryan  Services with the British Expeditionary Force, France
Mervyn Frederick Ryan — Director of Munitions Gauges
Francis Salisbury  Surveyor, General Post Office
John Sampson — Late British Representative on Anglo-Russian Sub-Committee in New York
Edward Marlay Samson — Chairman, South Wales Joint Committee, Ministry of Pensions
Lieutenant-Colonel Maxwell Barcham Sayer — Assistant Director, Inland Waterways and Docks, War Office
William Schooling — Member of the National War Savings Committee
Charles Scott — Lord Provost of Perth
John Renwick Seager  National War Aims Committee
Cornelius James Selway — Superintendent of the Line, Great Northern Railway
John Thomas Beadsworth Sewell  Solicitor to His Britannic Majesty's Embassy, Paris
Colonel Charles Henry Ludovic Sharman — Canadian Field Artillery
Albert William Smith — Chairman, Hartlepool Local Munitions Tribunal
Paymaster-in-Chief Charles Roach-Smith 
Edward Shrapnell Shrapnell-Smith — Chairman of the Standing Joint Committee of Mechanical Road Transport Associations; Chief Economy Officer, Petroleum Executive
George Scoby Smith  Commercial Manager, Messrs. Bolckow Vaughan and Co., Ltd.
Henry White Smith — Director and Secretary, British and Colonial Aeroplane Company., Ltd.; Chairman, Society of British Aircraft Constructors
James Cruickshank Smith — Vice-Chairman, Ministry of Munitions Special Arbitration Tribunal on Women's Wages; late Director, Wages Section, Ministry of Munitions
Major Percy George Darvil-Smith — County Director, Auxiliary Hospitals and Voluntary Aid Detachments, Middlesex
Robert John Smith— Convener of Transport Committee, Glasgow Area, Scottish Branch, British Red Cross Society
Thomas James Smith — Commissioner of Police, Belfast
Ida Elizabeth Smithe — Honorary Secretary, Rye Division of Sussex, British Red Cross and Order of St. John of Jerusalem; Commandant, Normanhurst Auxiliary Hospital, Battle
Phyllis, Baroness Somerleyton — Organiser and late Commandant, Chieveley Park Auxiliary Hospital, Suffolk
Commander Guy Standing  Member of the British War Mission-to the United States of America
Major Joseph Henry Stanley — Deputy Red Cross Commissioner, Mesopotamia
W. H. Steele — Assistant Traffic Manager and Acting Traffic Manager, Chinese Government Railways, Pekin-Mukden Line
Major Frank Augustus Douglas Stevens  Chairman, Bedfordshire Territorial Force Association
James Verdier Stevenson  Chief Constable of the City of Glasgow
William March Stevenson  Finance Section, Ministry of Blockade
Rear-Admiral Harry Hampson Stileman — Senior Naval Officer, Liverpool
Lieutenant-Colonel Edward Fairbrother Strange  Deputy Director of Butter and Cheese Supply, Ministry of Food
John Strong, Rector of the Royal High School, Edinburgh; President of the Educational Institute of Scotland
Acting Captain William Halpin Paterson Sweny 
William Swire — County Director, Auxiliary Hospitals and Voluntary Aid Detachments, Shropshire
Andrew Wilson Tait — Chairman, The British Aluminium Co., Ltd.
Muriel Lucy Talbot 
Brigadier-General Gerald Kyffin-Taylor  Director of National Service, North Western Region
Major The Rev. George Herbert Thompson — County Director, Auxiliary Hospitals and Voluntary Aid Detachments, Norfolk
William Bruce Thompson — Managing Director, Caledon Shipbuilding and Engineering Company
Robert Tootill  National War Aims Committee
Walter Livingstone Topple — Superintendent, The Electric and Ordnance Accessories Co., Ltd.
Captain John Henry Trye  Naval Adviser to Chief Censor, War Office
Jane Holland Turnbull  Controller of Medical Services, Queen Mary's Army Auxiliary Corps
Ernest James Turner — Assistant Secretary, Revenue and Statistics Department, India Office
Beresford Verschoyle — Chief Engineer, Egyptian State Railways
Captain Sidney Philip Charles Vesey  National War Aims Committee
Edward Robert Eckersall Vicars — His Britannic Majesty's Consul-General, Lyon
Hylda Henrietta, Lady DesVoeux — Chairman, Overseas Club, Soldiers' and Sailors' Fund
Henry William Wale  Chairman, Warwickshire (Coventry and District) Appeal Tribunal
Alexander Walker  Assessor of the City of Glasgow
Brevet Lieutenant-Colonel Herbert Sutherland Walker — Chief Permit Officer, Home Office
Sophie Florence Lothrop Hall-Walker — Organiser and Administrator of the Hall-Walker Hospital for Officers
William Walker — HM Acting Chief Inspector of Mines Member of Coal Export Committee
Sydney Walton — Ministry of Food
The Hon. Jean Templeton, Lady Ward — Commandant of Bathurst House Hospital for Officers, and of Ward's Hospital, Reigate
William Webster — National War Aims Committee
Major George Frederick Parrett West — Royal Engineers Superintendent of the Line, London and South-Western Railway
Constance Edwina, Duchess of Westminster — Organiser of No. 1 (Duchess of Westminster) Red Cross Hospital, France
Major Henry Frederick Wilkinson — Headquarters Staff, Metropolitan Special Constabulary
Richard Williamson
Robert Williamson  Managing Director, Mount Stuart Dry Docks Company, Cardiff
Second Lieutenant Thomas Olaf Willson — Ministry of Information
John Henry Wilson 
Joseph Maitland Wilson — County Director, Auxiliary Hospitals and Voluntary Aid Detachments, Suffolk
Robert Clermont Witt — Treasury Solicitor's Department; Trustee of the National Gallery
Augustus Ottiwell Wood — Chief Manager of the Imperial Bank of Persia, Teheran
Engineer-Commander William Henry Wood  Director and Engineering Manager, Messrs. John Brown & Co. Ltd
Lieutenant-Colonel Thomas Stanley Woodburn — Chief Commissioner, Australian Comforts Fund
George Ernest Woodward — Director of Ammunition Production. Admiralty
Thomas Henry Woolston  County Director, Auxiliary Hospitals and Voluntary Aid Detachments, Northamptonshire
Charles Henry Wordingham — President of the Institution of Electrical Engineers; Director of Electrical Engineering, Admiralty
Arthur Worley — General Manager, North British and Mercantile Insurance Company; Member of Committees advising the Ministry of Munitions on Explosion Claims and Explosion Indemnities
Albert Charles Wratislaw, His Britannic Majesty's Consul-General, Salonica
James Brown Wright  Chief Constable, City Police, Newcastle upon Tyne
Daniel Henderson Lusk Young  Director of Recruiting and Director of National Service, Northern Region

India
Charlotte, Lady Robertson 
Sir Fazulbhoy Currimbhoy Ebrahim — An Additional Member of the Council of the Governor-General for making Laws and Regulations; Joint Honorary Secretary, Bombay Branch of the Imperial Indian Wai-Relief Fund
Frank Willingdon Carter  Partner, Messrs. Turner, Morrison & Co.; Sheriff of Calcutta, Bengal
Charles Joseph Hallifax — Indian Civil Service; Commissioner, Jullundur Division, and a Member of the Council of the Lieutenant-Governor of the Punjab for making Laws and Regulations.
Percy Wyndham  Indian Civil Service; Commissioner of Kumaun, United Provinces
Lewis James Mountford — Indian Civil Service; Commissioner, Southern Division, Bombay.
Lieutenant-Colonel Alfred Charles Elliott — Indian Army; Deputy-Commissioner, Gurgaon, Punjab
Sheikh Asghar Ali — Indian Civil Service; Deputy Commissioner, Ludhiana, Punjab
Joseph Wilson-Johnston — Indian Civil Service; Deputy Commissioner, Jhelum, Punjab
William Browne Brander — Indian Civil Service; Deputy Commissioner, Tavoy District, Burma
Captain Neville Frederick Jarvis Wilson  Royal Indian Marine
Edward Pinder Fawcett — Indian Civil Service; Collector of Etah, United Provinces
Sri Raja Rao Venkata Kumara Mahipati Surya Rao Bahadur, Raja of Pithapuram, Godavari District, Madras
Sir Archibald Birkmyre — Partner, Messrs. Birkmyre Brothers, Bengal
Edward John Buck  Honorary Secretary, Indian Central Committee, "Our Day."
Sarat Kumar Mullick  Honorary Secretary, Bengali Regiment Committee, Calcutta

Egypt and the Sudan
William George Hayter — Counsel to His Highness the Sultan of Egypt and Legal Adviser to the Residency and the Ministries of Finance and Education
Gerald Campbell Dudgeon — Consulting Agriculturist with rank of Director-General in Ministry of Agriculture
Cyril Goodman  Assistant Director-General in the Department of Public Health
Major Randle Montagu Feilden — Reserve of Officers; Civil Secretary, Sudan Government

Officer of the Order of the British Empire (OBE)

Member of the Order of the British Empire (MBE)

Members of the Order of the Companions of Honour (CH) 
Colonel Sir Herbert Charles Perrott 
Sir Samuel Butler Provis 
Sir Frederick Treves

Distinguished Service Order (DSO)

Royal Navy
Commander Oswald Charles Merriman Barry  
Capt. Archer Napier Heathcote  
Vice-Admiral Frank Hannan Henderson 
Rear-Admiral Hugh Thomas Hibbert
Commander Thomas Alban Jones 
Lieutenant-Commander Oliver Locker-Lampson 
Commander Randal Borough McCowen  
Commander William Henry Owen  
Engineer Commander Elias George Pallot  
Major William Skeffington Poe, Royal Marine Artillery
Capt. Herbert Neville Rolfe  
Lieutenant-Commander Arthur Avison Scott  
Lieutenant-Commander Cuthbert Winthrop Swithinbank  
Engineer Commander William Symington Torrance  
Capt. Thomas Philip Walker  (Admiral, retired.)
Lieutenant-Commander Christopher John Frederick Wood  
Capt. George Bennett Weston Young 

Royal Air Force
Major John Eustace Arthur Baldwin
Major Arthur Courtney Boddam-Whetham
Captain Benjamin Henry Noel Hans Hamilton
Major Alwyn Vesey Holt
Captain Warwick Wright

For distinguished services rendered in connection with Military Operations on the Indian Frontier (Dated 1 January 1918)—
Major Arthur William Dauncey Cornish  Gurkha Rifles, Indian Army
Major Horace William Francis Twiss, Indian Army
Lieutenant-Colonel Ernest Douglas Money  Gurkha Rifles, Indian Army
Lieutenant-Colonel Frank William Frederick Johnson, Royal Sussex Regiment

For valuable services rendered in connection with Military Operations in Egypt —
Major Alexander Adams, Royal Engineers
Lieutenant-Colonel Allan Armstrong, Wiltshire Regiment
Major Frederic Ellis Ashton, York and Lancaster Regiment
Temp. 2nd Lieutenant Thomas Edward Bayne-Jardine, attd. Camel Trans Corps
Lieutenant-Colonel Hope Biddulph, Royal Field Artillery
Major Henry Jackson Butchart, Yeomanry
Captain and Brevet Major Geoffrey Alexander Campbell, Army Service Corps
Major James Donald Campbell, Royal Engineers
Captain Herbert William Carson  Royal Army Medical Corps
Rev. William Wilson Cash, Army Chaplains' Department
Major John Nevile Chaworth-Musters, Yeomanry
Major Arthur Montagu Colvile, Royal Garrison Artillery
Lieutenant-Colonel Edward Forbes Cooke-Hurle, Somerset Light Infantry
Captain and Brevet Major Martin Crawley-Boevey  Duke of Cornwall's Light Infantry
Lieutenant Albert Edward Harry Meyer Archibald, Lord Dalmeny  Grenadier Guards
Temp. Captain George Aubrey Faulkner, Royal Field Artillery
Lieutenant-Colonel Charles Alexander Fisher, Army Ordnance Depot
Temp. Captain Annesley de Rinzy Gordon, attd. Camel Corps
Temp. Captain Archibald Glen  Royal Engineers
Captain Frederic Snowden Hammond, London Regiment
Temp. Captain James Hay, Spec. List
Major Robert Wynne Henderson, Indian Cavalry
Temp. Captain Charles Martin Hickley, Royal Engineers
Major Charles Wood Hill, West India Regiment
Major John Meredith Hulton, Royal Sussex Regiment
Major and Brevet Lieutenant-Colonel Richard Carey Jellicoe, Army Service Corps
Major and Brevet Lieutenant-Colonel Pierce Charles Joyce, Connaught Rangers
Major George Chester Douglas Kempson, East Lancashire Regiment, attd. Army Ordnance Depot
Lieutenant-Colonel William Kinnear, Royal Field Artillery
Captain James William Bainbridge Landon, Army Service Corps
Captain Thomas Bramley Layton  Royal Army Medical Corps
Major John Wilson Leitch  Royal Army Medical Corps
Lieutenant-Colonel James Lightbody, Royal Field Artillery
Major and Brevet Lieutenant-Captain Hugh William McCall, Yorkshire Regiment
Lieutenant-Colonel Angus John McNeill, Yeomanry
Captain and Brevet Major Christian George Maude  Royal Fusiliers
Rev. Hugh Craig Meeke  Army Chaplains' Department
Rev. Robert Henry Nash, Army Chaplains' Department
Lieutenant-Colonel Joseph George Needham, Army Service Corps
Captain and Brevet Major Rex Hamilton Osborne  Hussars
Major and Brevet Lieutenant-Colonel Vere Lorraine Nuthall Pearson, Middlesex Regiment
Temp. Lieutenant Edward Townley Peel  Wiltshire Regiment
Temp. Major Maurice Portal, Remount Service
Captain Harry Edwin Powell, Army Veterinary Corps
Captain Percy James Simpson  Army Veterinary Corps
Captain Oskar Teichmann  Royal Army Medical Corps
Major Arthur Felix Thomas, Manchester Regiment
Lieutenant-Colonel Hugh Wright Thomson  Royal Army Medical Corps
Major Oliver Miles Torkington, Scottish Rifles
Captain Sidney Joseph Williams, Army Veterinary Corps
Major Harold Rene Wilson, Royal Field Artillery
Lieutenant-Colonel Sir Mathew Richard Henry Wilson  Yeomanry
Major Edward Woolmer  Lancashire Fusiliers

Australian Imperial Force
Major Percival John Bailey, Light Horse Regiment
Major Thomas Joseph Daly, Light Horse Regiment
Lieutenant-Colonel Arthur Lacy Dawson, Army Medical Corps
Major Harold Albert Duckett White, Light Horse Regiment

New Zealand Force
Major Charles Ernest Hercus, Medical Corps
Major Stephen Charles Phillips Nicholls, Staff Corps

For distinguished service in connection with Military Operations in Salonika —
Hon. Lieutenant-Colonel Richard Fuller Barber, Army Ordnance Depot
Capt. Hon. Rupert Edward Selborne Barrington, Yeomanry
Major Daniel Burges, Gloucestershire Regiment
Temp. Major Aubrey Ernest Burt, Oxfordshire and Buckinghamshire Light Infantry
Major Hugh Frederick Byrne, Army Ordnance Depot
Temp. Major James Elliot Cairnes, Royal Field Artillery
Major Leslie Humphreys Church, Army Service Corps
Major Ivor Staveley Cobbe Royal Garrison Artillery
Major and Brevet Lieutenant-Colonel William James Norman Cooke-Collis, Royal Irish Rifles
Temp. Major Maurice Rhynd Dickson, Royal Scots Fusiliers
Temp. Major Herbert Dippie, Worcestershire Regiment
Temp. Major Harry George Ditcham, Gen. List
Major John David Beveridge Erskine, Manchester Regiment
Major and Brevet Lieutenant-Colonel Julian Fane, Gloucestershire Regiment
Major George Forbes Carpenter Finch, Royal Garrison Artillery
James Lemprière Ormidale Barcaple Findlay, Army Chaplains' Department
Temp. Major William Veasey Franklin, South Wales Borderers
Major Frederick Joseph Garland  Royal Army Medical Corps
Major Edward Chase Hall, Royal Field Artillery
Captain Isidor Morris Heilbron (later Ian Heilbron), Army Service Corps
Major and Brevet Lieutenant-Colonel Charles Ernest Hollins, Lincolnshire Regiment
Captain and Brevet Major Benjamin Johnson  Royal Army Medical Corps
Temp. Major Charles Godfrey Jones, Welsh Regiment
Major Horace Augustus Kirby  Royal Garrison Artillery
Captain and Brevet Major George Riland Francis Leverson, Northumberland Fusiliers
Lieutenant-Colonel Montagu Marmion Lowsley, Royal Army Medical Corps
Captain Hector Graham Gordon Mackenzie  Royal Army Medical Corps
Captain John Munro Mackenzie, Royal Scots
Major and Brevet Lieutenant-Colonel William Miller, Middlesex Regiment
Major Reginald Henry Phillimore, Royal Engineers
Major Henry Chambre Ponsonby  King's Royal Rifle Corps
Captain John Rae, Army Veterinary Corps
Temp. Captain Charles Percival Rea, Royal Scots Fusiliers
Temp. Major Oswald Arthur Scott, Hampshire Regiment
Major Allen Aldwin Soames, King's Royal Rifle Corps
Captain and Brevet Major Alexander Craven Vicary  Gloucestershire Regiment
Major Guy Bernard Campbell Ward, South Wales Borderers
Captain Hildred Edward Webb-Bowen, Royal Engineers
Lieutenant-Colonel John Robert Whait  Royal Army Medical Corps
Major Ralph Koper White, Royal Army Medical Corps
Major George Hamilton Wilkinson, Supply and Transport Corps, Indian Army
Temp. Major Harold Waterlow Wiltshire  Royal Army Medical Corps
Temp. Major Edward Francis Broome Witts, Gloucestershire Regiment
Major and Brevet Lieutenant-Colonel Harold Charles Webster Hale Wortham, Royal Irish Fusiliers
Major Clifton Vincent Reynolds Wright, South Wales Borderers
Major Philip Caynton Yonge, Essex Regiment

For distinguished services rendered with the British Forces on the Mediterranean Line of Communications —
Captain Thomas Williams Lloyd, Liverpool Regiment, Royal Engineers

For valuable services rendered in connection with Military Operations in Italy —
Temp Captain James Abbey  Royal Field Artillery
Captain and Brevet Major Arthur Nugent Acland  Duke of Cornwall's Light Infantry
Major Ronald Forbes Adam, Royal Horse Artillery
Major William Adam, Worcestershire Regiment
Temp Major William Moore Alpine, King's Royal Rifle Corps
Lieutenant-Colonel and Brevet Colonel Sir Dalrymple Arbuthnot  Royal Artillery
Major Arthur Barwick Lloyd Baker, Oxfordshire & Buckinghamshire Light Infantry 
Captain and Brevet Major John Blount-Dinwiddie, Army Service Corps
Major Charles Barnard Bonham, Royal Engineers
Major Charles Edward Dunscomb Bridge  Royal Artillery
Captain David Adye Buchan, Royal Field Artillery
Captain Robert Moyle Burmann  East Lancashire Regiment
Major Richard Whiteside Burnyeat, Royal Field Artillery
Captain Charles Sidney Burt, South Staffordshire Regiment
Major The Hon. Arthur Claud Spencer Chichester, Irish Guards
Temp Major James William Sabben Clare, Army Service Corps
Major Stewart Coats, Argyll & Sutherland Highlanders
Major Henry Crawshay, Worcestershire Regiment
Lieutenant-Colonel William Chapman Croly, Royal Army Medical Corps
Lieutenant Raymond Howarth Cutting  Devonshire Regiment, attd. Machine Gun Corps
Captain Harold Darby, Army Service Corps
Major George Strachan John Fuller-Eberle, Royal Engineers
Temp Major Alfred James Fraser, Army Service Corps
Major Henry John Gordon Gale, Royal Garrison Artillery
Major Guy Edward Augustus Granet  Royal Field Artillery
Captain Thomas Arthur Green  Royal Army Medical Corps
Captain Leonard Arthur Hawes  Royal Artillery
Temp Major George Rainald Henniker-Gotley, Machine Gun Corps
Quartermaster and Hon. Major Ernest Thomas Hynes
Captain Hon. Ronald Dudley Kitson  West Yorkshire Regiment
Temp Captain Thomas Leslie Longhurst, Army Service Corps
Temp Major William Keith Maclachlan, Northumberland Fusiliers
Captain Forbes Lankester McNaughton, Royal Field Artillery
Major Frederick Lewis Makgill-Crichton-Maitland, Gordon Highlanders
Captain John Campbell Maclntyre Matheson, Cameron Highlanders, attd. Machine Gun Corps
Captain John Carew Meredith, Royal Garrison Artillery
Captain George Swiney Miller, Royal Warwickshire Regiment
Major Martin Joseph Minogue  East Surrey Regiment
Major Patteson Womersley Nickalls, Yeomanry
Captain Richard William Oldfield  Royal Field Artillery
Temp Captain Wilfred John Pearson  Royal Army Medical Corps
Captain Richard Persse  South Staffordshire Regiment
Captain Wilfrid Gould Pidsley, London Regiment
Captain Frederick Spencer Pountney, London Regiment
Temp Major Oscar Stanley Pratt, Middlesex Regiment
Captain and Brevet Major Harold St George Schomberg, East Surrey Regiment
Major Thomas Henry Sebag-Montefiore  Royal Horse Artillery
Major William Thomson Sheppard, Army Ordnance Depot
Lieutenant Joseph Snape  South Staffordshire Regiment, attd. Honourable Artillery Company
Major Harold Smurthwaite Kemplay Snowdon, Royal Garrison Artillery
Captain Harry Strevens  Royal Warwickshire Regiment, empld. Devonshire Regiment
Captain Douglas Hervey Talbot  Lancers
Lieutenant Arnold John Thompson  Scots Guards
Temp Lieutenant Henry Edward Verey
Major John Thornhill Wallace  Royal Artillery
Major Hardress William Lucius Waller  Royal Artillery
Captain and Brevet Major Eric Stuart White, Army Service Corps
Lieutenant Harry Willans  Bedfordshire Regiment

For services rendered in connection with Military Operations in France and Flanders —
Lieutenant-Colonel Francis Adams, Indian Cavalry
Temp Major William James Allen, Royal Irish Rifles
Captain Harry Surtees Altham  King's Royal Rifle Corps
Temp Lieutenant Herbert Courtenay Atkin-Berry  General List
Temp Captain Richard Nunn Aylward  Royal Engineers
Temp Major Bernard Granville, Baker, Yorkshire Regiment
Major George Boyd Balfour, Royal Lancaster Regiment
Lieutenant Charles James Prior Ball  Royal Artillery, attd. Royal Horse Artillery
Temp Captain Augustine Barker  Royal Field Artillery
Major Thomas Ashley Barren, Royal Army Medical Corps
Captain Herbert Barter, Royal Horse Artillery
Major Richard Lionel Barton, Royal Garrison Artillery
Temp Captain William Major Batchelor  Royal Engineers
Major Herbert Copeland Cary Batten, Dorsetshire Regiment
Major and Brevet Lieutenant-Colonel Lionel Seton Bayley, Royal Garrison Artillery 
Captain Cuthbert Theodore Baynham, Royal Field Artillery
Captain Reginald Lindsay Benson  Lancers
Temp Lieutenant-Colonel Samuel Bingham, Liverpool Regiment
Temp Lieutenant-Colonel Julius Guthlac Birch, King's Royal Rifle Corps
Captain Percy Yates Birch, Royal Garrison Artillery
Temp Captain Thomas Griffin Bird, Royal Engineers
Major Gerald Halsey Birkett, South Wales Borderers. 
Hon. Major William Samuel George Bishop, Army Ordnance Depot
Captain William Blackwood  Royal Army Medical Corps
Temp Major Thomas Wootton Blakeway, Army Service Corps
Captain Algernon Lothian Bonham-Carter, King's Royal Rifle Corps
Major Alan George Barwys Bourne  Royal Marine Artillery
Temp Major William Allan Bowen, Royal Lancaster Regiment
Major Gerald Charles Jervis Brady, Royal Field Artillery
Lieutenant John Breckon, Rifle Brigade 
Temp Captain George Bremner  Royal Engineers
Temp Lieutenant Rawdon Briggs  Royal Engineers
Lieutenant Victor Charles Brind, Royal Field Artillery 
Hon. Major Edwin John James Britton, Army Ordnance Depot
Captain John Grahame Brockbank, Army Service Corps, seconded to Tank Corps
Captain Robert Weston Brooke  Yeomanry
Major Herbert Devenish Lennon Brown, Royal Garrison Artillery
Lieutenant-Colonel Alfred Percy Browne, Indian Cavalry
Lieutenant-Colonel Gerald Trevor Bruce, Yeomanry, Lincolnshire Regiment
Captain Edgar James Bernard Buchanan, Royal Engineers
Temp Captain John Buckley  General List
Captain Captain Francis William Bullock-Marsham  Hussars
Major Duncan Elidor Campbell, Yeomanry
Temp Captain Murtough Carbery  Royal Field Artillery
Major Reginald Edward Cecil, Lancers
Captain Melrose Thomas Chapman, Army Service Corps
Temp Captain William Adam Chapman
Temp Captain Major and Brevet Lieutenant-Colonel William Gwyther Charles, Essex Regiment
Captain and Brevet Major Julius Francis Chenevix-Trench, Northumberland Fusiliers
Major John Strange Spencer Churchill, Yeomanry
Captain Colin Clarke  Royal Army Medical Corps
Temp Major Geoffrey Shaw Clayton, Liverpool Regiment
Major William Boyer Clayton, Army Service Corps
Temp Major Norman Benson Clegg, Army Service Corps
Major Shuckburgh Upton Lucas-Clements, Royal Irish Fusiliers
Lieutenant-Colonel Charles William Cochrane, Army Service Corps
Temp Major William Hewett Coles, Middlesex Regiment
Major Gilbert Faraday Collett, Gloucestershire Regiment
Lieutenant-Colonel William Fellowes Collins, Dragoons
Lieutenant-Colonel Edward Walter Comyn, Royal Garrison Artillery
Temp Captain James Alphonsus Conway  Royal Army Medical Corps
Captain Rupert Ramsay Copeland, Royal Field Artillery
Major Cecil Uvedale Corbett, Yeomanry
Major Garnet Robert de la Cour Corbett, Royal Garrison Artillery
Lieutenant Geoffrey Robert Josceline Corbett, Coldstream Guards
Major Harold John Couchman  Royal Engineers
Lieutenant-Colonel John Coulson, Army Service Corps
Captain Ernest Marshall Cowell  Royal Army Medical Corps
Captain and Brevet Major William James Cranston, North Staffordshire Regiment
Major Robert Quentin Craufurd, Royal Scots Fusiliers
Lieutenant-Colonel Bertram Edward Crocker, Welsh Regiment
Temp Major Cecil Howe Cropper  Royal Engineers
Captain Elward Guy Kynaston Cross, Hussars
Major Whitworth Charles Crosse, Army Service Corps
Captain John Durnford Crosthwaite  London Regiment, Norfolk Regiment 
Alan Gordon Cunningham  Royal Field Artillery
Captain Francis William Murray Cunningham  Royal Army Medical Corps
Lieutenant Edward Curran  Royal Field Artillery
Major James Fairly Daly, Highland Light Infantry, Gloucestershire Regiment
Major Charles George Francis Davidson  Royal Garrison Artillery
Captain Paul Victor Davidson, Royal Warwickshire Regiment
Temp Captain John Wharton Lloyd Davies  Royal Engineers
Temp Captain Richard Howell Davies, Royal Engineers
Major Henry Gordon Dean, Lincolnshire Regiment
Temp Captain Harold Henry de Laessoe  General List
Temp Captain Leonce Delphin  Royal Engineers
Lieutenant-Colonel Percy Theodosius Denis de Vitré, Royal Engineers
Major Edgar John de Pentheny O'Kelly, Royal Welsh Fusiliers
Major William Chester Dixon, Leicestershire Regiment
Captain Samuel Henry Doake, Royal Field Artillery
Captain James Jardine Dobie, Hussars
Lieutenant-Colonel John Graham Dooner, Royal Field Artillery
Major Malcolm Gordon Douglas  Honourable Artillery Company
Temp Major Charles Child Dowding  Welsh Regiment
Temp Captain Ralph Evelyn Drake-Brockman, Royal Army Medical Corps
Major and Brevet Lieutenant-Colonel Arthur Houssemayne du Boulay, Royal Engineers 
Major Augustus Cecil Hare Duke, late Royal Garrison Artillery
Temp Captain Robert Norman Duke  General List
Major Thomas Edwin Durie  Royal Field Artillery
Major William Allaire Edmeades, Royal Garrison Artillery
Major Cecil Aubrey Eeles, Royal Field Artillery
Captain Charles Hertel Egerton  Royal Engineers
Captain Henry Cecil Elwes  Scots Guards, attd. Royal Irish Rifles
Lieutenant-Colonel Abraham England, Army Service Corps
Major Arthur Kenlis Lord Farnham, North Irish Horse, attd. Royal Inniskilling Fusiliers
Major Arthur Edward Flynn Fawcus  Manchester Regiment, attd. North Staffordshire Regiment
Captain and Brevet Major Arthur Alston Fenn, Royal Fusiliers, and Intell. Corps
Major Francis Augustus Ferguson, Royal Engineers
Major Hubert Wogan Festing, Durham Light Infantry, attd. Yorkshire Light Infantry
Lieutenant-Colonel William Edward Foggie  Royal Army Medical Corps
Captain Vincent Tennyson Randle Ford, York and Lancaster Regiment, empld. Northumberland Fusiliers
Major and Brevet Lieutenant-Colonel Richard Foster Carter Foster, Royal Marine Artillery
Captain and Brevet Major Claude Howard Stanley Frankau  Royal Army Medical Corps
Captain and Brevet Major Harold Edmund Franklyn  Yorkshire Regiment
Captain Harry Read Gadd  Suffolk Regiment, attd. Nottinghamshire & Derbyshire Regiment
Lieutenant-Colonel James William Garden, Royal Field Artillery
Temp Captain Frederick diaries Gavin, Army Veterinary Corps
Major George German, Leicestershire Regiment
Captain Joseph Holmes Gettins, Army Service Corps
Major Willie Roland Gibson, Army Service Corps
Major John Maxwell Gillatt, Royal Scots
Major Geoffrey Goyer Gilligan, Argyll & Sutherland Highlanders, attd. Nottinghamshire & Derbyshire Regiment
Lieutenant Richard Kenneth Glascodine  London Regiment
Captain and Brevet Major Guy de Courcy Glover  South Staffordshire Regiment
Major Walter Hugh Godsal  Durham Light Infantry
Major George Joseph Power Goodwin, Royal Engineers
Major George Gould, Indian Cavalry
Captain William Gray, Army Service Corps
Temp Captain Samuel Sowray Greaves  Royal Army Medical Corps
Captain and Brevet Major Wolseley de Haga Haig, Royal Engineers
Major Richard Collis Hallowes  Royal Army Medical Corps
Major Hugh St. George Hamersley, Royal Garrison Artillery
Captain Gerard Montague Hamilton, Royal Field Artillery
Major Sandford Raymond Alers Hankey, South Irish Horse
Captain Francis Kyle Hardy, York and Lancaster Regiment
Major Wilfred Harris-St. John, Royal Welsh Fusiliers
Major Leonard Herbert Pocock Hart, Lincolnshire Regiment, attd. York and Lancaster Regiment
Temp Major Charles Francis Hawkins  Tank Corps
Captain Rowland Charles Hawkins, Honourable Artillery Company
Temp Captain Ronald Bruce Hay, Royal Garrison Artillery
Captain Robert Evelyn Manners Heathcote, Royal Scots
Temp Lieutenant Malcolm Heddle, Royal Garrison Artillery
Captain Robert Hemphill, Royal Army Medical Corps 
Hon. Major John Acheson Henderson, Hussars
Major Charles Gwynn Hetherington, Royal Garrison Artillery
Captain Frances Bland Hewson  York and Lancaster Regiment
Captain Francis John Hext  Royal Field Artillery
Major Eustace Hill, Yeomanry
Major Geoffrey Noel Hill, Royal Garrison Artillery
Lieutenant Herbert Hobday  Royal Field Artillery
Major Ernest Charles Hodgson, Indian Medical Service
Major Richard Carlyle Holme, Royal Garrison Artillery
Major Harold James Holness, Army Veterinary Corps
Major John Urmson Hope, Royal Garrison Artillery
Lieutenant Thomas Horton, Royal Garrison Artillery
Major and Brevet Lieutenant-Colonel Alan John Hunter  King's Royal Rifle Corps
Captain Richard Devas Hunter, Scottish Rifles
Major Edward Maitland Hutchinson, Royal Field Artillery
Lieutenant-Colonel Arnold Irwin, Northumberland Fusiliers
Captain Reginald Strutt Irwin, Royal Highlanders, attd. Border Regiment
Captain Thomas Ivey, Royal Irish Rifles
Temp Major Albert John Stanley James  Royal Welsh Fusiliers
Major Montagu Irvine Gedoin Jenkins, Devonshire Regiment
Major Harry Johnson, North Staffordshire Regiment
Captain Samuel Gordon Johnson  South Staffordshire Regiment attd. Royal Engineers
Temp Captain Albert Jones  Royal Army Medical Corps
Captain Cedric la Touche Turner Jones  Royal Engineers
Major Douglas Champion Jones, Royal Engineers
Major Oscar John Forrestall Keatinge, North Staffordshire Regiment
Captain John Philip Kellett  London Regiment
Temp Major Frank Pery Knox, Army Service Corps
Major Francis John Langdon, Liverpool Regiment
Captain Henry George Charles, Viscount Lascelles, Grenadier Guards
Major Harold Futvoye Lea, York Regiment
Lieutenant-Colonel Francis Holdsworth Leather, Army Service Corps
Temp Major Walter Henry Levy, Army Service Corps
Major Rowland Philip Lewis, Royal Army Medical Corps
Major Creighton Hutchinson Lindsay  Royal Army Medical Corps
Captain and Brevet Major Edward Prince Lloyd, Lincolnshire Regiment, attd. Northumberland Fusiliers
Major Reginald George Albert Lloyd, South Lancashire Regiment
Captain Ambrose Lorne Lockwood  Royal Army Medical Corps
Captain and Brevet Major Albert de Lande Long, Gordon Highlanders
Captain Thomas Martin Lowry  Duke of Cornwall's Light Infantry, attd. Royal Engineers
Captain Thomas Gabriel Lumley Lumley-Smith, Lancers
Major William McCracken, Argyll & Sutherland Highlanders
Lieutenant James Alexander Macdonald, Royal Field Artillery
Captain Thomas Wilson MacDonald, Border Regiment
Major Claud Macfie, Seaforth Highlanders
Major Raoul Donald Carnegy Macleod, Lancers, Indian Army
Captain Alan David Macpherson  Royal Field Artillery
Captain Arthur Norman Roy McNeill, Royal Army Medical Corps
Captain and Brevet Major Gordon Nevil Macready  Royal Engineers
Major George Ramsay Maitland, Indian Cavalry
Major Thomas Harry Saunders Marchant, Hussars
Captain Francis Alleyne Marr  Cambridgeshire Regiment
Major Archibald Victor Powell Martin, Wiltshire Regiment
Captain Edwyn Sandys Dawes Martin  Dragoon Guards
Captain James Hall Martin  Royal Lancaster Regiment
Major Ernest Albert Churchward Matthews, Indian Medical Service
Major John William Henry Maturin, Army Service Corps
Major Stephen Mead, Royal Garrison Artillery
Major Henry Edward Medlicott. Indian Cavalry
Lieutenant-Colonel Frank Middleton, Royal Field Artillery
Major Kenneth Eugene Milford, Royal Artillery
Captain Sinclair Miller  Royal Army Medical Corps
Major Percy Reynolds Mitchell, Royal Garrison Artillery
Captain Malcolm Edward Moir, Royal Field Artillery
Temp Captain Harry Morton  Nottinghamshire & Derbyshire Regiment
Major Altham Leonard Moulton-Barrett, Dorsetshire Regiment
Lieutenant John Spencer Muirhead  Royal Engineers
Major Aldwin Montgomery Munby, Border Regiment
Captain Cyril Alexander George Octavius Murray, King's Own Scottish Borderers
Major Joseph Nail, Royal Field Artillery
Lieutenant-Colonel Charles Cowan Newnham, Indian Army
Major Thomas Cochrane Newton, Royal Field Artillery
Major St. John Richardson Nicholson, Royal Garrison Artillery
Major Fergus Brinsley Nixon, Royal Inniskilling Fusiliers
Temp Hon. Captain Humphrey Nockolds, Royal Army Medical Corps
Temp Major Henry Lowcay Norcock, Army Service Corps
Temp Captain Reginald Lewis Nunn, Royal Engineers
Lieutenant-Colonel William Oddie, West Yorkshire Regiment
Major Edwin Herbert O'Reilly-Blackwood  Royal Garrison Artillery
Captain John Marcus William O'Rorke, Cavalry, Indian Army
Temp Major Thomas George Pace, Army Service Corps
Captain Henry Wellington Tuthill Palmer, Royal Engineers
Lieutenant-Colonel Hugh Robert Palmer, Royal Garrison Artillery
Lieutenant John Stanley Parsons, Royal Engineers
Temp Captain Arthur Alexander Adam Paterson  Royal Field Artillery
Temp Captain Cecil Herbert Peck  Royal Field Artillery
Major Ivan Cockayne Pery-Knox-Gore  Royal Field Artillery
Temp Captain Edward Darley Powell  Royal Engineers
Lieutenant-Colonel John Powell  Royal Army Medical Corps
Major Noel Percival Richard Preeston, Royal Field Artillery
Captain Humphrey Hollond Prideaux  Northumberland Fusiliers
Temp Major Charles Raymond Radclyffe, Army Service Corps, attd. Tank Corps
Major Philip Rashleigh, Royal Garrison Artillery
Major Robert Amyatt Ray, Royal Lancaster Regiment
Captain John Guildford Redfern, East Yorkshire Regiment
Temp Major Evan Thomas Rees  South Wales Borderers
Major Julian Yorke Hayter Ridout, Royal Field Artillery
Major Thomas Charles Lockhart Rivis, Army Service Corps
Captain Gordon McMahon Robertson, North Staffordshire Regiment, attd. Royal Dublin Fusiliers 
Temp Lieutenant Frederick Wilfred Robinson  Machine Gun Corps
Temp Captain Arthur Leslie Rogers, Royal Field Artillery
Temp Captain Reginald George Royle, Yorkshire Light Infantry
Temp Captain Charles Hermann Schmettau Runge  General List
Captain Curtois Fraser Maxwell Norwood Ryan  Royal Engineers
Major Rupert Sumner Ryan, Royal Field Artillery
Captain Gerald Robert Sandeman  Border Regiment
Temp Major Reginald Ernest Sanders, Army Service Corps
Major Arthur Johnson Savage, Royal Engineers 
Surg.-Major Arthur Wilson Shea, Nottinghamshire & Derbyshire Regiment
Lieutenant-Colonel William George Simpson  London Regiment
Major Thomas Henry Limerick Spaight, Royal Engineers
Temp Lieutenant-Colonel Kenneth Robert Napier Speir, Royal Engineers 
Major Alexander William Ramsay Sprot, Argyll & Sutherland Highlanders
Temp Captain Matthew Reginald Steel  Northumberland Fusiliers
Major John Robert Stevenson, Army Veterinary Corps
Temp Captain Henry French Stephens  Royal Field Artillery
Major Harold William Puzey Stokes, Army Service Corps
Temp Major Christopher Reynolds Stone  late Royal Fusiliers
Major John Hartrick Stone, Army Ordnance Depot
Temp Captain Arthur Hubert Street, Royal Garrison Artillery
Major Edward Verrinder Sydenham, Royal Warwickshire Regiment
Maj, Lyster Robert Edward Waters Taylor, Royal Garrison Artillery
Captain James Tennant, South Lancashire Regiment, attd. Army Corps of Clerks
Captain James Gilbert Thompson  Liverpool Regiment
Captain Vivian Home Thomson  Royal Field Artillery
2nd Lieutenant Noel Shipley Thornton, Rifle Brigade. 
Captain Meredith Denison Townsend, Royal Field Artillery
Major George Courtenay Tracy, Duke of Cornwall's Light Infantry
Lieutenant-Colonel Alan Gordon Troup, Army Service Corps
Major Alan Charles Turner, Royal Army Medical Corps
Captain Warrington Royds Tylden-Wright, Hussars
Major John Ellis Viccars, Leicestershire Regiment
Major George Crespigny Brabazon, Baron Vivian, Yeomanry
Captain Richard Henry Waddy, Somerset Light Infantry
Captain Ernest Wentworth Wade  Royal Army Medical Corps
Temp Major Clement William Waite, East Yorkshire Regiment
Major Arthur Dunbar Walker, Royal Engineers
Temp Lieutenant-Colonel Bertram James Walker, Royal Sussex Regiment
Temp Captain Arnold Horace Santo Waters  Royal Engineers
Major Douglas Percival Watson  Royal Army Medical Corps
Captain Thomas Hovenden Watson  Worcestershire Regiment, attd. Nottinghamshire & Derbyshire Regiment
Major Charles Ramsay White, Yorkshire Regiment
Temp Major James Wightman  East Surrey Regiment
Temp Captain Gerard William Williams  Royal Engineers
Major Arthur Peere Williams-Freeman, Duke of Cornwall's Light Infantry
Captain Alfred John Williamson, Royal Army Medical Corps
Captain Edward Willson, Royal Garrison Artillery
Major Cyril Francis Baronneau Winterscale, Shropshire Light Infantry
Captain Rupert Bryson Withers, Royal Garrison Artillery
Temp Captain Frederick Arthur Woodcock, Royal Field Artillery
Temp Major Ernest Trevor Langebear Wright, Army Service Corps
Captain Geoffrey Machel Hungerford Wright  Royal Irish Fusiliers
Captain Sydney Campbell Wright, Royal Field Artillery
Captain Robert Rennie Yalland, Leicestershire Regiment
Major George Alexander Yool, South Staffordshire Regiment, attd. Leicestershire Regiment
Major James Maclaren Young, Royal Lancaster Regiment

Canadian Force
Lieutenant-Colonel George Joseph Boyce, Army Medical Corps
Major Jeffrey Harper Bull, Infantry
Major George Lynch Cameron, Infantry
Major William Kellman Chandler, Infantry
Captain Arthur Paul Chattell, Infantry
Major Edward John Cleary; Army Service Corps
Lieutenant-Colonel Frederick Minden Cole, Garrison Artillery
Major John Cormack Craig, Railway Troops
Major Ashton Bluett Cutcliffe, Army Veterinary Corps
Lieutenant-Colonel Anson Scott Donaldson, Army Medical Corps
Major Archer Fortescue Duguid, Field Artillery
Lieutenant-Colonel Archibald Earchman, Railway Troops
Major Charles Edgar Edgett, Army Veterinary Corps
Major Douglas Stewart Ellis, Engineers
Major Charles Flint, Railway Construction Corps. 
Hon. Captain Rev. Francis Laurence French, Chaplains' Service
Major Norman Gentles, Infantry
Major George Herbert Rae Gibson, Army Medical Corps
Lieutenant-Colonel Archibald Lome Campbell Gilday
Lieutenant-Colonel Edward Theodore Barclay Gillmore, Field Artillery
Major William David Greer, Army Service Corps
Lieutenant-Colonel John Nisbet Gunn, Army Medical Corps
Lieutenant-Colonel Colin Clark Harbottle, Infantry
Lieutenant-Colonel Joseph Hayes, Army Medical Corps
Major Hugh James Heasley, Army Service Corps
Major Daniel Hillman, Engineers
Major Albert Ernest Humphrey, Cyclist Corps
Lieutenant-Colonel William George Hurdman, Field Artillery
Lieutenant-Colonel Daniel Paul Kappele, Army Medical Corps
Lieutenant-ColonelWalter Bernard Kingsmill, Pioneers
Major Gordon Ernest Leighton, Infantry
Lieutenant-Colonel Ibbotson Leonard, Cavalry
Major Theodore Adolf Lomer, Army Medical Corps
Major Atwood Talbot Mackay, Field Artillery
Major Robert Carlyle Mackenzie, Infantry
Major Neil Bruce Maclean, Garrison Artillery
Major Walter Edward Maxfield, Mounted Rifles
Major Lawrence Walter Miller, Mounted Rifles
Major Arnott Grier Mordy, Infantry
Major William Neilson, Infantry
Lieutenant-Colonel Lafayette Harry Nelles, Infantry
Major Alexander Thomas Paterson, Field Artillery
Lieutenant-Colonel John Jenkin Penhale, Field Artillery
Major Henry Edward Pense, Infantry
Major Norman Dundas Perry, Cent. Ont. Regiment
Major William Gordon Peterson, Quebec Regiment
Lieutenant-Colonel John George Piercey, Field Artillery
Major Thomas Head Raddall, Infantry
Major William Rhoades  Mounted Rifles
Major Norman Roy Robertson, Engineers
Major Cecil Bell Russell, Engineers
Major Charles Greatley Saunders, Army Veterinary Corps
Major John Nelson Semmens, Infantry
Major Wallace James Sharpe, Cavalry
Major George Wyman Shearer, Field Artillery
Lieutenant-Colonel James Crossley Stewart, Field Artillery
Major Allan Elsworth Taylor, Infantry
Brigadier-General Herbert Cyril Thacker  Field Artillery
Lieutenant-Colonel John Thomas Connolly Thompson, Infantry
Lieutenant-Colonel Hugh Crawford Walkem, Pioneers
Major Arthur Leslie Walker  Infantry
Major Donald Alexander White, Field Artillery
Major Edward Alexander Cumberland Wilcox, Infantry

Australian Force
Major Leslie Ellis Beavis, Field Artillery Brigade
Major William Henry Berry, Army Service Corps
Major Francis Lawrence Bignell, Army Medical Corps
Major Archibald Clifford Black-low, Machine Gun Corps
Major John Alexander Brazenor, Army Service Corps
Lieutenant-Colonel Edward Thomas Brennan 
Major Arthur Balfour Douglas Brown, Provost Corps
Major Athol Frederick Burrett, Infantry
Major Herbert Richard Byrne, Field Artillery
Lieutenant-Colonel James Purcell Clark, Int
Major Arthur Ross Clayton, Army Medical Corps
Major Norman Clowes  Field Artillery
Quartermaster and Hon. Major Frederick William Craig, Infantry
Major Alan Percy Crisp, Field Artillery
Major Harold Charles De Low, Field Artillery
Major Robert Johnstone Donaldson, Engineers
Major Norman Lockhart Dreyer, Field Artillery
Major Albert Tange Dunlop, Army Medical Corps
Major Alexander Arthur Evans  Field Artillery
Major Thomas Charles Cann Evans, Army Medical Corps
Major Lyndhurst Falkiner Giblin, Infantry
Major Hugh Reginald Hallard, Field Artillery
Major John Hamilton, Army Service Corps
Major Samuel Herbert Hancox, Engineers
Major George Gordon Heslop, Army Veterinary Corps
Lieutenant-Colonel Stanley George Allen Hindhaugh, Light Horse
Captain Mervyn John Holmes, Army Medical Corps
Captain Robert William Hore, Field Artillery
Lieutenant-Colonel William Edward James, Infantry
Lieutenant-Colonel William Elphinstone Kay, Army Medical Corps
Major Reginald George Legge  Infantry
Major Donald Stuart Mackenzie, Army Medical Corps
Lieutenant-Colonel Frederick Arthur Maguire, Army Medical Corps
Major Douglas Gray Marks  Infantry
Lieutenant-Colonel Ernest Edward Martin, Infantry
Major Robert John Allwright Massie, Infantry
Major John Newman, Infantry
Major Harold Ordish, Machine Gun Corps
Major Douglas Duke Paine, Australian Army Service Corps
Lieutenant-Colonel Balcombe Quick, Australian Army Medical Corps
Major Edward Alfred Hall Randall, Artillery
Colonel Charles Rosenthal,  Imperial Force
Major Arthur Bruce Sandford, Field Artillery
Major Leslie Cyril Sando, Army Service Corps
Major John Joseph Scanlan, Infantry
Lieutenant-Colonel Arthur Edmund Shepherd
Major Walter Jaques Stack, Army Medical Corps
Major Raymond Augustus Stanley, Engineers
Major George Alan Vasey, Artillery
Major Wilfred Vickers, Army Medical Corps
Major Sydney James Walker, Field Artillery
Major Blair Anderson Wark, Infantry
Captain Herbert Frazer Watson  Infantry
Lieutenant-Colonel Aubrey Roy Liddon Wiltshire  Infantry
Lieutenant-Colonel Henry Douglas Wynter, General List
Major Herbert Alexander Youden, Infantry

New Zealand Force
Major Duncan Eric Gardner, Field Artillery
Major James Binnie Whyte, Army Service Corps
Major Eric Arthur Widdowson 
Major Henry Gordon Wilding, Field Artillery

South African Contingent
Major George Melville Bennett, Heavy Artillery
Major Frank Eardley Cochran, Infantry
Lieutenant-Colonel Frederick Stuart Dawson  Infantry
Lieutenant Sydney Bernard Edwards, Heavy Artillery
Lieutenant-Colonel Francis George Harvey, Defence Force
Major Claude Rigby Heenan, Infantry
Major Herbert Sidney Lamond Hemming, Infantry
Major Charles Molteno Murray 

For distinguished services rendered in connection with Military Operations in Russia—
Lieutenant-Colonel Reginald St. Clair Battine, Indian Cavalry

Awarded a Bar to the Distinguished Service Order (DSO*)
For valuable services rendered in connection with Military Operations in Egypt —
Lieutenant-Colonel Edward Halhed Hugh Elliot  Royal Field Artillery
Lieutenant-Colonel William Carmichael Peebles  Royal Scots
Major Edward Harold Wildblood  Leinster Regiment

For services rendered in connection with Military Operations in France and Flanders —
Major Spencer Acklom  Highland Light Infantry, attd. Northumberland Fusiliers
Captain and Brevet Major Hon. Eric Octavius Campbell  Seaforth Highlanders 
Temp Major Philip Hamond  Tank Corps (late Coldstream Guards)
Lieutenant-Colonel Arthur Henry Seton Hart-Synnot  East Surrey Regiment
Major Hon. Evelyn James Hewitt  Dorsetshire Regiment, attd. Duke of Cornwall's Light Infantry
Temp Major Francis Rowley Hill  Middlesex Regiment
Captain William Vernon Lumsden  Argyll & Sutherland Highlanders, attd. Scottish Rifles
Captain Arthur Thomas Pitts  Royal Army Medical Corps
Major Edward Harrison Rigg  King's Own Yorkshire Light Infantry, attd. Royal Inniskilling Fusiliers
Major William Digby Stillwell  Royal Field Artillery
Temp Captain Herbert James Tortise  Royal West Surrey Regiment
Major James Walker  West Riding Regiment

Canadian Force
Lieutenant-Colonel Cameron MacPherson Edwards  Infantry
Lieutenant-Colonel Edward Hilliam  Nova Scotia Regiment
Lieutenant-Colonel James Kirkcaldy  Infantry
Lieutenant-Colonel William Smith Latta  Infantry
Lieutenant-Colonel Lionel Frank Page  Infantry

For valuable services rendered in connection with Military Operations in Italy —
Temp Major Anthony Charles Barnes  Yorkshire Regiment

Distinguished Service Cross (DSC)
Lieutenant Stanley Napier Blackburn

Military Cross (MC)

Lieutenant Albert Leigh Abbott, Royal Engineers
Temp Lieutenant Henry Murray Achilles, Royal Field Artillery
Lieutenant Graham Adam, Royal Engineers
Temp Captain Edward James Board Akerman, General List
Temp Captain Wilfred Herbert Alderton, Royal Army Medical Corps
Temp Captain Ernest Daniel Alexander, Royal Engineers
Lieutenant Robert Alexander, Royal Garrison Artillery
Temp Captain Robert Harper Alexander  Royal Army Medical Corps
Temp Lieutenant Geoffrey Cuthbert Allchin, Royal Engineers
Temp Lieutenant Frederick Cecil Atkin Allday, Tank Corps (formerly Army Service Corps)
Temp 2nd Lieutenant Harry Gordon Allen, Machine Gun Corps
Lieutenant Benjamin George Kidston Allsop, Army Service Corps
Temp Lieutenant Ernest Aspin Almond, Royal Field Artillery
Temp Captain Herbert Thomas Amy, Royal Field Artillery
Lieutenant Reginald Charles Andersen, Royal Engineers
Lieutenant George Boyd Anderson, Royal Field Artillery
Lieutenant Laurence Robert Dacre Anderson, Royal Field Artillery
Temp Quartermaster and Hon. Lieutenant Robert J. Anderson, West Yorkshire Regiment
Captain Robert Pringle Anderson  Royal Army Medical Corps
Captain Claude Lancelot Andrewes, Indian Cavalry
Lieutenant Alfred Andrews, Nottinghamshire & Derbyshire Regiment
Temp Quartermaster and Hon. Lieutenant George Samuel Annett, Royal Army Medical Corps
Temp 2nd Lieutenant Alex Leslie Arnaud, Tank Corps
Temp Lieutenant Henry Cheriton Arnold, Royal Garrison Artillery
Temp Lieutenant Charles Gordon Arthur, Royal Field Artillery
Captain Cecil Ashby, Middlesex Regiment
Lieutenant Edward Neville Ashe, Manchester Regiment
Lieutenant George Dyson Aspland, Royal Engineers
Lieutenant Edgar Raymond Atkins, Royal Field Artillery
Captain Arthur Neville Austen, Royal Field Artillery
Temp Captain Fernley Clifford Austin, Welsh Regiment
Rev. Francis Aveling, Army Chaplains' Department
Temp 2nd Lieutenant George Edward Backhouse, Machine Gun Corps
Captain Oswald Felix Baerlein, Army Service Corps
Captain Kenneth Vernon Bailey, Manchester Regiment
Temp 2nd Lieutenant Arthur Harold Baker, Tank Corps
Lance Captain Geoffrey Thomas Baker, Royal Army Medical Corps
Lieutenant Robert Percival Baker, Royal West Kent Regiment 
2nd Lieutenant Thomas George Baker, Royal Field Artillery
Captain Dudley Vere Morley Balders, Suffolk Regiment
Company Sergeant Major Percy William Baldry  East Kent Regiment
Temp Captain Andrew Campbell Balfour, Highland Light Infantry
Captain Arthur Edmund Ball, Worcestershire Regiment
Lieutenant William Moses George Ball, Dorsetshire Regiment
Captain Richard Pitt Ballard  Royal Army Medical Corps
Temp Lieutenant Roy Frederic Balmain, Royal Field Artillery
Lieutenant Frederick John Baly, Royal Field Artillery
Temp Lieutenant David Henry Bannerman, Royal Engineers
Quartermaster Sergeant John Barbour, Royal Irish Fusiliers
Company Sergeant Major David Barclay  Royal Highlanders
2nd Lieutenant Edward James Barford, Royal Garrison Artillery
Quartermaster and Hon. Captain Arthur Barker, Yorkshire Light Infantry
Lieutenant Cyril Walker Barnard, Yeomanry
Captain George William Wynne Barnley, Royal Garrison Artillery
2nd Lieutenant William Barr, Royal Garrison Artillery
2nd Lieutenant Thomas William Bartlett, Royal Garrison Artillery
Lieutenant Frederick Thomas Bass, Royal Field Artillery
2nd Lieutenant William Batcheldor, Leicestershire Regiment
Temp Captain Stanley Batchelor, Royal Army Medical Corps
Lieutenant William Herbert Bateman, Royal Engineers
Lieutenant William Latham Bateson, Royal Engineers
Temp Captain William David Bathgate, Royal Army Medical Corps
Temp 2nd Lieutenant Gavin Hector Baxter, Royal Engineers
Temp Captain Bernard James Lewis Beard, General List
Temp 2nd Lieutenant John Edmund Beecroft, Tank Corps
Captain Harold Bell, Royal Lancaster Regiment
2nd Lieutenant John Douglas Bell, Royal Field Artillery
Lieutenant John Henry Bell, Hampshire Regiment
Lieutenant Edmund Redfern Bennett, Scots Guards, attd. Machine Gun Guards
Captain Herbert John Bennett, Oxfordshire & Buckinghamshire Light Infantry 
Temp Lieutenant Stephen Gordon Bennett, Royal Engineers
2nd Lieutenant Charles Grey Benstead, London Regiment, attd. Tank Corps
2nd Lieutenant Albert Berliner, Royal Garrison Artillery
Temp Lieutenant Alberic Willoughby Bertie, Royal Field Artillery
Temp Captain Albert Frank Best, Royal Sussex Regiment
Temp Captain Claude Robert Bicknell, Royal Garrison Artillery
Captain Martin Stokes Bigwood, Worcestershire Regiment
Captain George Bingham, Liverpool Regiment
Lieutenant Thomas Blackburn, Cheshire Regiment
Lieutenant Reginald Herbert Blake, Royal Engineers
Captain Kendall Trelawny Blamer, Lancashire Fusiliers
Lieutenant Valentine Stevens Bland, Royal Field Artillery
Temp Lieutenant John Boag, Royal Scots Fusiliers
2nd Lieutenant Sydney William Boast, South Lancashire Regiment
Sergeant Major Alfred Bolland, Royal Army Medical Corps
Captain Thomas Bone, Army Veterinary Corps
Sergeant Major Adolphe Moulton Boreham, Royal Welsh Fusiliers
Lieutenant George William Bost, Royal Engineers
Lieutenant Norman Sandeman Bostock, South Staffordshire Regiment
Lieutenant Edward Morley Westwood Boughton, Royal Engineers
Temp Captain Clifford John Boulton, Welsh Regiment
Captain Stanley Weeks Boulton, Royal Garrison Artillery
Temp 2nd Lieutenant Harold Bourne, Royal Engineers
Temp 2nd Lieutenant Reginald Edward Bowes, Royal Field Artillery
Temp Captain David Drummond Bowie, Shropshire Light Infantry
Company Sergeant Major Frederic George Bowtell, Machine Gun Corps
2nd Lieutenant Kenneth James Box, Yorkshire Light Infantry
Temp Lieutenant Thomas Boyce  Royal Inniskilling Fusiliers
Captain Harold Boyd-Rochfort  Lancers
Captain Edward Thomas Arthur George Boylan, Royal Horse Artillery
Lieutenant Reginald Basil Brace, Nottinghamshire & Derbyshire Regiment
Temp Regimental Sergeant Major Arthur Herbert Bradbury, Royal Warwickshire Regiment
Captain Charles Henry Bradley, Royal Engineers
Lieutenant Joseph Harold Bradley, Liverpool Regiment
Lieutenant William Allan Bradley, Durham Light Infantry
Lieutenant Francis Patrick Bray, Royal Engineers
Temp Captain Claude Hamilton Brazel, Royal Engineers
Temp Captain Malcolm Brechin, Royal Garrison Artillery
2nd Lieutenant Thomas Bride, Liverpool Regiment
2nd Lieutenant Harry Carrington Briggs, Royal Field Artillery
Quartermaster and Hon. Captain John Broadley, Durham Light Infantry
Sergeant Major Robert Brock, Gordon Highlanders
Lieutenant Duncan Reynett Brodie, Scots Guards, 
Lieutenant Frank Brook, Yorkshire Light Infantry
Lieutenant Francis Napier Broome, Royal Field Artillery
Quartermaster and Hon. Lieutenant William Thomas Brotherton, Coldstream Guards
Lieutenant John Brown, Manchester Regiment
Lieutenant John Carolan Brown, Connaught Rangers
Lieutenant Richard Roland Brown, Royal Field Artillery
Temp 2nd Lieutenant Maximilian Herbert Browne, General List
Captain Henry Montague Browne, London Regiment
Temp Captain William Brownlie  Royal Army Medical Corps
Temp Captain Charles Walter Gordon Bryan, Royal Army Medical Corps
Captain Alexander Carruthers Bryson  Royal Army Medical Corps
Temp Lieutenant William Buchanan, Army Cyclist Corps
Temp Captain Richard Maclean Buckley, Royal Engineers
Temp 2nd Lieutenant Harold Percy Budge, Tank Corps
Captain Henry Ion Bulkeley, Royal Engineers
Temp Lieutenant Ralph Bassett Bullock, Gloucestershire Regiment
Temp Captain John Willden Burdett, Leicestershire Regiment
Quartermaster and Hon. Captain William Burnett, Liverpool Regiment
Captain William Maurice Brownlie Burnyeat, Monmouthshire Regiment
Temp Captain Eric Thomas Burr, General List
Temp Lieutenant Lawrence Buckley Burtt, London Regiment
Temp Lieutenant Charles Albert Butcher, Royal Engineers
Temp Lieutenant Thomas Charles Butcher, Royal Field Artillery
Temp Lieutenant Louis John Caffrey, Rifle Brigade
Temp Captain Robert Nixon Caldwell, South Wales Borderers
Captain Charles Frederick Campbell, Royal Horse Artillery
Captain Hugh Campbell, Royal Garrison Artillery 
Temp Captain William Orr Campbell, Army Service Corps
Temp 2nd Lieutenant Duncan Carmichael, North Lancashire Regiment
Lieutenant David Macfarlane Carmichael, Royal Field Artillery
Temp Lieutenant Richard Carpentir, Royal Artillery
Temp Lieutenant James Walter Carr  Royal Fusiliers
Temp Captain Tom Stewart Carr, Royal Field Artillery
Lieutenant Hugh Clay-Carter, South Staffordshire Regiment
Temp Captain Clement Ignatius Casey, General List
Temp Lieutenant Simon Magnus Castello, Intell. Corps
Lieutenant Harvard Wells Cave, Royal Field Artillery
2nd Lieutenant Edward Randal Chadwyck-Healey, Royal Artillery
Lieutenant James Chalmers  Royal Scots, attd. Machine Gun Corps
Company Sergeant Major John Wisley Chalmers, Gordon Highlanders
Captain Bernard Isbister Chambers, Royal Engineers, Spec
Captain Francis Gibaut Chambers, Royal Garrison Artillery
Temp Captain Charles Chamier, Bedfordshire Regiment
Lieutenant Stephen Henry Deschamps Chamier, West Yorkshire Regiment
Captain Claude Cyril Chandler, West Yorkshire Regiment
Captain Frederick Charles Chandler  Royal Army Medical Corps
Temp Captain Christopher Heukensfeldt Chapman, Royal Garrison Artillery
Lieutenant Henry Robert George Lydd Chapman, London Regiment
Company Sergeant Major Leonard William Chapman, Northamptonshire Regiment
Temp Lieutenant Robert McLeod Chapman, General List
Lieutenant John Compton Cavendish, Lord Chesham, Hussars
Lieutenant Thomas Bird Cheverton, Royal Field Artillery
Temp 2nd Lieutenant David John Chisholm, Royal Engineers
Lieutenant Nevill Christopherson, Royal Field Artillery
Temp Quartermaster and Hon. Lieutenant Alexander Clark, Seaforth Highlanders
Temp Lieutenant Richard Michael Clark, Royal Engineers
2nd Lieutenant William Bailey Clarke, Royal Field Artillery
Company Sergeant Major Stanley Richard Clay, Grenadier Guards
Sergeant Major William Cleall, Duke of Cornwall's Light Infantry
Rev. Charles Close, Army Chaplains' Department
2nd Lieutenant William Thomas Cobb, South Wales Borderers
Lieutenant Montagu Campbell Wynyard Cobby, Royal Garrison Artillery
Lieutenant William Cockburn, Yeomanry
Lieutenant Arthur Richard Montagu Cockerton, Royal Field Artillery
Company Sergeant Major John Cole, West Yorkshire Regiment
Temp Lt Edward Charles Batt Collinp 
Lieutenant Edward Alexander Colliver, Army Service Corps
Temp Captain Herbert Woodroffe Colliver, Royal Field Artillery
Temp Lieutenant Edward Howe Collinson, Machine Gun Corps
2nd Lieutenant George Collyer, Royal Engineers
Lieutenant Albert Osmond Colvin, London Regiment
Temp 2nd Lieutenant Charles Blampied Colston, Royal Engineers
Temp Captain Frank Conan, Army Service Corps
Temp Captain Bloomfield George Henry Connolly  Royal Army Medical Corps
Temp Lieutenant Eric Seymour Connor, Royal Field Artillery
Captain Charles Graham Arthur John Conyers, Royal Field Artillery
Lieutenant Edward Alexander Cook, West Yorkshire Regiment
Temp Captain Charles Herbert Cooke, Northumberland Fusiliers
Lieutenant Cyril Hands Cooke, Royal Berkshire Regiment
Temp Sergeant Major Thomas Cooper, Royal Artillery
Temp 2nd Lieutenant Charles Egbert Cope, Oxfordshire & Buckinghamshire Light Infantry 
Sergeant Major Ernest Cope, Nottinghamshire & Derbyshire Regiment
Lieutenant Douglas Chatterton Bruce Copeland, London Regiment
Captain Thomas William Corbett, Indian Cavalry
Lieutenant Frederick Benjamin Cornelius, Royal Engineers 
Company Sergeant Major Peter Coulter  Cheshire Regiment
Captain Henry Cowan, Army Service Corps
Company Sergeant Major James Coxon, West Riding Regiment
2nd Lieutenant Archibald Craig, Gordon Highlanders
2nd Lieutenant Stephen Cranston, Scottish Rifles
Lieutenant Philip Cranswick, Royal Engineers
Lieutenant Victor Raymond Wallen Crawford, Royal Garrison Artillery
Captain Andrew Creery, Royal Garrison Artillery
Lieutenant Edward William Cremer, Rifle Brigade
Temp Lieutenant Charles Alexander Crighton, Intell. Corps
Temp Lieutenant Frederick Leo Crilly, Royal Irish Fusiliers 
Sergeant Major Leslie Alfred Cronk, Royal Army Medical Corps
Temp Captain William Noel Crosby, Yorkshire Regiment 
Company Sergeant Major Gilbert Rhodes Cross  Liverpool Regiment
Lieutenant Edward Neufville Crosse, Royal Field Artillery
2nd Lieutenant Albert Ernest Crowder, South Wales Borderers
2nd Lieutenant Patrick Benignus Cullinan, Leinster Regiment
Captain Edward Ronald Culverwell, Royal Garrison Artillery
Lieutenant Fenton King Cummins, Connaught Rangers
Lieutenant John Cecil Currie, Royal Horse Artillery
2nd Lieutenant Richard Curzon-Hope, Essex Regiment
Temp 2nd Lieutenant David Chalmers Cuthbertson, Army Service Corps
Temp Captain Alec Hugh Dabell, Royal Field Artillery
Captain Frederick Dakin, Royal Garrison Artillery
Lieutenant Alfred Percival Dale, Royal Garrison Artillery
Company Sergeant Major Robert Dalgleish, Royal Irish Rifles
Temp Lieutenant Francis Herbert Dallison, Royal Engineers
Lieutenant Norman Dameral Dalton, Middlesex Regiment, Machine Gun Corps
Company Sergeant Major Hedley George Dancocks, Middlesex Regiment
Lieutenant George Darby, Royal Field Artillery
Temp Lieutenant John Alexander Davidson, Royal Engineers
2nd Lieutenant Douglas Joseph Davies, Royal Dublin Fusiliers
Temp Quartermaster and Hon. Captain George Frederick Davies, Northumberland Fusiliers
Lieutenant Hubert Benson Davies, Monmouthshire Regiment
Captain Hugh Warburton Davies, Worcestershire Regiment
Temp Captain Matthew Henry Davies, Intell. Corps
Lieutenant Geoffrey Alan Davies-Colley, Manchester Regiment
Lieutenant Percival William Davis, Royal Engineers
Captain David Dempster  Royal Army Medical Corps
Captain Roland Dening, Indian Cavalry
Temp Captain Kenneth Robert Fullarton Denniston, Royal Field Artillery
Temp Captain Harold Derbyshire, Royal Garrison Artillery
Captain James Derham-Reid, Royal Army Medical Corps
2nd Lieutenant John Hamilton des Voeux, North Staffordshire Regiment, attd. Machine Gun Corps
Temp Captain John Wescott Dew  Royal Army Medical Corps
Captain Alan Peile Dickinson, Liverpool Regiment
2nd Lieutenant James Ian Blomfield Dickson, Royal Garrison Artillery
Temp Lieutenant Thomas William Dickson, Royal Engineers
Temp Lieutenant Thomas Francis Dillon, Royal Engineers
Temp Lieutenant Gaëtan Ogier d'Ivry, Royal Field Artillery
2nd Lieutenant George Frederick Dixon, East Yorkshire Regiment
Temp Lieutenant Herbert Ridley Dixon, Royal Engineers
Lieutenant Reginald Francis Dixon, Royal Garrison Artillery
Captain Robert Speir Dixon, Highland Light Infantry
Lieutenant Scott Ure Dobbie, Argyll & Sutherland Highlanders
Temp Captain Percy Coultas Dodsworth, Northumberland Fusiliers
Temp Sergeant Major Alfred George Dollery, East Lancashire Regiment
Lieutenant John Donaldson, Manchester Regiment
Captain Edward Mungo Dorman, Dragoon Guards
Temp Captain John Campbell-Douglas, Royal Irish Rifles
Lieutenant Norman Douglas-Stephenson, North Lancashire Regiment
Lieutenant Alfred Dowson, Royal Garrison Artillery
Captain Frederick Vanderstegen Drake, Hussars
Temp 2nd Lieutenant Charles Edward Drakes, Royal Engineers
Temp Lieutenant Wilfrid Dresser, Yorkshire Regiment
Captain Murray Whitford Dring, Army Service Corps
Captain Kearsley Mathwin Drummond, Northumberland Fusiliers
Captain Squire Duff-Taylor, Royal Dublin Fusiliers
Company Sergeant Major Alexander Duncan, Argyll & Sutherland Highlanders
Lieutenant John Grant Duncan-Hughes, Royal Field Artillery
Lieutenant Robert William Dundas, Royal Scots
Temp Captain John Bruce Dunn, Highland Light Infantry
Lieutenant Charles Hinton Du Pre, Army Service Corps
Temp Lieutenant Charles Eade, Machine Gun Corps. 
Company Sergeant Major Bolton Earle, West Riding Regiment
Captain Charles Seymour Eastwood, London Regiment
Lieutenant The Hon. Robert Evelyn Eden, Royal Horse Artillery
Lieutenant Herbert Geoffrey Edleston, Royal Engineers
Temp Captain George Edwardes-Lawrence, Army Ordnance Depot
Captain Douglas Clayton Henry Edwards, Somerset Light Infantry
2nd Lieutenant Ferdinand Robert Eiloart, Royal Garrison Artillery
Lieutenant Louis Alfred Ekins, London Regiment
Captain George Sampson Elliston, Royal Army Medical Corps
Lieutenant Rudolph Philip Elwes, Coldstream Guards
Lieutenant Richard Embleton, Army Service Corps 
Captain Gerald Rufus, Viscount Erleigh, Officers Training Corps
Lieutenant Arthur David Glanffrwyd Evans, Royal Horse Artillery
Lieutenant Hugh Elwyn Evans, Yorkshire Regiment
Lieutenant Sidney Thomas Evans, Royal Garrison Artillery
Captain Gordon Evill, Manchester Regiment
Temp Captain Keith Douglas Falconer  Royal Army Medical Corps
2nd Lieutenant George Neil Farquhar, Royal Field Artillery
Temp Captain Cecil John Fearfield, Royal Engineers
Lieutenant Oswin Joseph Feetham, Border Regiment
Captain Edward Anthony Fielden, Hussars
Temp Lieutenant Sydney Vavasseur Figg, Royal Warwickshire Regiment
Temp Captain Harry Fine, East Kent Regiment
Temp Captain Richard Desmond Fitzgerald  Royal Army Medical Corps
Temp 2nd Lieutenant William Gibson Flatters  Royal Engineers
Temp 2nd Lieutenant Leonard Fletcher  Northumberland Fusiliers
Lieutenant Francis Reginald Floyd, Devonshire Regiment
Temp Lieutenant Henry Arthur Foley, Somerset Light Infantry
Temp Lieutenant Albert Victor Ford, Royal Engineers
Temp Lieutenant Richard Warren Forrestal, Royal Field Artillery
Sergeant Major Charles Warcup Foster, East Yorkshire Regiment
Captain Charles Leslie Foulds, West Yorkshire Regiment
Captain Thomas Shirley Foweraker, Gloucestershire Regiment
Lieutenant Arthur Percival Haughton Fowler, Royal Fusiliers
Lieutenant John Fox, Manchester Regiment
Temp Captain Ronald Henry Fox, Royal Horse and Royal Field Artillery
Temp Captain Denys Paul Campbell Franks, Army Service Corps
Quartermaster and Hon. Captain Charles Frederick Fraser, Royal Army Medical Corps
Captain Gordon Fraser, Suffolk Regiment
Lieutenant James Alexander Traill Fraser, London Regiment
Temp Captain Noel William Freeman, Royal Field Artillery
Temp Captain Alexander James Rudolph Frantzel, Royal Fusiliers
Lieutenant David Benny Frew, Royal Engineers
2nd Lieutenant Francis Edward Fry, Royal Garrison Artillery
2nd Lieutenant Frank Fuller, Herefordshire Regiment
Temp Captain Thomas Frederick Furnell, King's Royal Rifle Corps
Temp Lieutenant Frederick Gordon Gadd, Royal Lancaster Regiment
Temp Lieutenant Herbert Anthony Gale, Wiltshire Regiment
Captain Robert Arthur Gallie, Yeomanry 
Company Sergeant Major Samuel Foster Gamble, Leicestershire Regiment
Quartermaster and Hon. Captain Louis John Edward Garcia, York and Lancaster Regiment
Captain Robert Gardner, Royal Lancaster Regiment
Temp Lieutenant Charles Edgar Garland, Nottinghamshire & Derbyshire Regiment
Temp Captain William Edward Garrett Fisher, Highland Light Infantry
Lieutenant William Roscoe Gaskell, South Lancashire Regiment, attd. Machine Gun Corps
2nd Lieutenant Herbert Arthur Gatward, Royal Garrison Artillery
Captain Oliver Gaunt, Royal Field Artillery
Lieutenant David Gee, Royal Warwickshire Regiment
Lieutenant George Augustine Gee, Royal Garrison Artillery 
Lieutenant Frederick Charles George, Royal Field Artillery 
Temp Lieutenant Ronald Julius Wernher Gervers, Intell. Corps
Captain Thomas Pilling Gibbons, Hertfordshire Regiment
Temp Lieutenant Evelyn Reginald Gibson, Royal Garrison Artillery
2nd Lieutenant George William Gibson, Royal Garrison Artillery
Lieutenant William James Gilbert, Royal Lancaster Regiment
Lieutenant Alfred Oscar Gilby, Royal Field Artillery, Royal Army Medical Corps
Temp Captain Hope Murray Gillespie  Royal Army Medical Corps
Lieutenant Harold Gilliat, West Yorkshire Regiment
Captain James FitzGerald Gloster, Royal Munster Fusiliers
Temp Captain Cecil Arnold Godfrey, North Lancashire Regiment
Lieutenant Cuthbert Eustace Going, Middlesex Regiment
Temp Captain George Hartley Goldsmith, Royal Engineers
Sergeant Major Alfred Gooch, Royal Field Artillery
Temp Captain Harold Gooch, Royal Engineers
2nd Lieutenant William Henry Good, Connaught Rangers
Rev. John Goodacre, Army Chaplains' Department
Captain Claude Oliver Goodchild, Liverpool Regiment
Temp Lieutenant Roy Walton Gooddy, Army Service Corps Royal Field Artillery
Temp Lieutenant Frank John Goode, Machine Gun Corps
Captain James Gordon Goodfellow, Royal Engineers
Quartermaster and Hon. Lieutenant Harry Vincent Goodman, Liverpool Regiment
Quartermaster and Hon. Major Andrew Gordon, Royal Scots
Lieutenant Cosmo Alexander Gordon, Grenadier Guards
Captain Charles Alexander Cosmo Gordon, Royal Garrison Artillery
Lieutenant Roland Elphinstone Gordon, Royal Field Artillery
Lieutenant Vernon William Goss, Royal Field Artillery, Royal Field Artillery
Company Sergeant Major John Gough, Yorkshire Light Infantry
Lieutenant Frederick Gould, London Regiment
Captain Charles Norman Gover  Royal Army Medical Corps
Rev. Albert Philip Gower-Rees, Army Chaplains' Department
Captain William James Graham, Gordon Highlanders
Temp Captain Donald Farquharson Grant, Royal Field Artillery
Captain Archibald Frank Gray, Royal Garrison Artillery
Temp Captain John William Grayston, Royal Garrison Artillery
Captain Bernard Green, Oxfordshire & Buckinghamshire Light Infantry, attd. Machine Gun Battalion
Lieutenant Edward Ernest Green, Royal Engineers
Temp Captain George Alan Green, Tank Corps
Lieutenant George Richard Green, Grenadier Guards
Company Sergeant Major Sydney Charles Green, Suffolk Regiment
Captain Edward Allan Greene, Yeomanry
Lieutenant Eric Kingsley Greenhow, Royal Engineers
Lieutenant Roger Gresley, Royal Field Artillery
Temp Lieutenant Charles Boyd Grey, Royal Garrison Artillery
Lieutenant Geoffrey Grice, Royal Garrison Artillery
Lieutenant Kenneth Walton Grigson, Devonshire Regiment
Captain Gerald Baxter Groom, West India Regiment
Rev. Edward Montmorency Guilford, Army Chaplains' Department
Captain Frederick Gwatkin, Indian Cavalry
Temp Captain Leonard Herbert Haines, General List
2nd Lieutenant Alfred Halkyard, Leicestershire Regiment
Sergeant Major William Hall, Royal Garrison Artillery
Temp 2nd Lieutenant William Donald de Putron Hall, Royal West Kent Regiment
Rev. John Edmund Hamilton, Army Chaplains' Department
Temp 2nd Lieutenant Ronald Trant Hamilton, Royal Irish Regiment
Lieutenant Edmund Bland Hammond, Royal Engineers
Lieutenant Harold Joseph Hampson, Manchester Regiment
Temp Captain Ronald Montague Handfield-Jones, Royal Army Medical Corps
Lieutenant Herman Charles Hannam-Clark, Royal Engineers
Lieutenant William Charles Hanworth, Royal Field Artillery
2nd Lieutenant Harry Gladwyn Harcourt, Royal Dublin Fusiliers, attd. Machine Gun Corps
Temp Lieutenant Grainger Hope Hargreaves, Royal Engineers
2nd Lieutenant Harold Henry Harman, London Regiment
Lieutenant Charles Harris, Royal Field Artillery 
Lieutenant Maurice William Sidney Harris, Middlesex Regiment
2nd Lieutenant William Harrison, Liverpool Regiment, attd. Machine Gun Corps
Captain Ernest Hart, North Lancashire Regiment
Temp Lieutenant Harold Eaton Hart, Royal Field Artillery
Temp 2nd Lieutenant Walter Hart  Royal Fusiliers
Lieutenant Douglas Arthur Harvey, Royal Field Artillery
Captain Nicholas Hopkins Henry Haskins  Royal Army Medical Corps 
Captain Sidney Martin Hattersley  Royal Army Medical Corps 
Temp Lieutenant James George Hatton, Royal Field Artillery
Captain David Harvey Haugh, Seaforth Highlanders, attd. Machine Gun Corps. 
Lieutenant Geoffrey Severin Anthony Hawkins, Royal Field Artillery Scots
Temp Captain John Berry Haycraft  Royal Army Medical Corps
Captain John Grenville Hayter, Royal Field Artillery
Temp 2nd Lieutenant Cyril Hayward, Yorkshire Light Infantry
Lieutenant Robert Charles Hayward, South Lancaster Regiment
Temp Captain William Augustus Hazeldine, General List
Lieutenant Fredrick James Heasman, Grenadier Guards
2nd Lieutenant Robert Sholto Hedderwick, Royal Garrison Artillery
2nd Lieutenant Alfred Charles Heggs, Machine Gun Corps
Temp Captain Henry Harold Hemming, Royal Artillery 
Lieutenant Bertram Mackay Henderson, Gordon Highlanders
Temp Captain James Elmslie Henderson, Royal Artillery
Temp Lieutenant William Watson Henderson, King's Own Scottish Borderers
Lieutenant John Gairdner White Hendrie, Royal Field Artillery
Lieutenant Vaughan Augustus Herbert, Indian Army Reserve of Officers
Temp Lieutenant Bernard John Herrod, Northumberland Fusiliers
2nd Lieutenant Bertie Barron Hewat, Royal Field Artillery
Temp Captain William Edgar Hewett, Machine Gun Corps
Quartermaster and Hon. Captain Henry Hickie, Irish Guards
Lieutenant Anderson Cunningham Hill, Royal Engineers, secd. Tank Corps
Lieutenant Fred Hill, Liverpool Regiment
Temp Captain Hugh Burrow Hill, General List
Lieutenant Reginald William Welfare Hills, Royal Fusiliers
Temp Captain Godfrey John Douglas Hindley  Royal Army Medical Corps
Quartermaster and Hon. Captain Charles Hinchcliffe, West Yorkshire Regiment
Captain Charles Julius Hirst, Yeomanry
Temp 2nd Lieutenant Leonard George Hirst, Royal Engineers
Temp Lieutenant Wilfred Hobbs, Bedfordshire Regiment
Lieutenant Montague William Hocker, Scots Guards, attd. Machine Gun Guards
Temp Lieutenant Thomas Gerald Hodgkinson, Royal Field Artillery
Captain Charles Gordon Hogg, Seaforth Highlanders
Temp Lieutenant Vyvyan George Holgate, Royal Engineers
Lieutenant Sidney Harry Holley, Manchester Regiment
Temp Lieutenant Stanley York Holloway, Lines. Regiment
Lieutenant Adrian Holman, Royal Field Artillery
Temp 2nd Lieutenant Grimshaw Holt, Royal Welsh Fusiliers
Lieutenant Edward Noel St. John Leslie Homan, Army Service Corps
Lieutenant John Mackenzie Bax Homfray, Royal Field Artillery
Captain Benjamin Honour, Royal Field Artillery
Temp Lieutenant William John Hood, Royal Fusiliers
Temp Captain Edward Thomas Hook, Welsh Regiment
Lieutenant Eric Francis Hope, Royal Garrison Artillery
Quartermaster and Hon. Captain William Miller Hope, Durham Light Infantry
Lieutenant Arthur Emlyn Hopkins, East Lancashire Regiment
Temp Lieutenant William Samuel Hopkins, Tank Corps
Captain Herle Maudslay Hordern, Royal Garrison Artillery
Lieutenant Harold Reginald Home, Leicestershire Regiment
Captain Alfred Lionel Homer, Army Veterinary Corps
Temp Lieutenant William Horsley, Tank Corps
Temp Lieutenant Murray Frank Horton, Royal Field Artillery
Temp Captain Eric Bernard Hough, Liverpool Regiment
Lieutenant John Reginald Houghton, London Regiment
Lieutenant William Henry House, Royal Field Artillery
2nd Lieutenant Douglas Walter Howard, London Regiment
Lieutenant Harold George Howson, Royal Field Artillery
Sergeant Major Frank Huband  Royal Fusiliers
Lieutenant Charles Henry Hudson, Seaforth Highlanders
Company Sergeant Major William Huggins, Oxfordshire & Buckinghamshire Light Infantry 
Temp Captain Aubrey Everard Hughes, Royal Engineers
Quartermaster Sergeant Frank Hughes, Royal Fusiliers
Temp 2nd Lieutenant Bertram Henry Hull, Army Service Corps
Lieutenant Edwin William Arnold Humphreys, Royal Engineers
Temp Lieutenant Norman Richard Hunting, Northamptonshire Regiment
Lieutenant Charles Frederic Hurndall, Royal Field Artillery
2nd Lieutenant Alfred Huskisson, Machine Gun Corps
Temp Lieutenant John Garbutt Hutchinson, Army Service Corps
Temp 2nd Lieutenant Adam Fraser Hutchison, Royal Horse and Royal Field Artillery
Lieutenant Joseph Hutton, South Lancashire Regiment
Temp Captain Austin Harvey Huycke  Royal Army Medical Corps
Temp 2nd Lieutenant Oliver Francis Huyshe, Army Service Corps
Temp Lieutenant Philip Ingleson, General List
Temp Lieutenant Bruce Stirling Ingram, Royal Artillery
Temp Captain Harloe Alfred Taylor O'Callaghan Irwin, Royal Engineers
Temp 2nd Lieutenant Robert Beatty Wylie Irwin, Royal Inniskilling Fusiliers
Lieutenant James Albert Iveson, Royal Garrison Artillery
Temp Lieutenant Daniel J. Jack, Army Ordnance Depot
Quartermaster and Hon. Captain George Jackson, Durham Light Infantry
Temp Lieutenant Geoffrey John Jackson, Tank Corps
Temp Captain Walter Frederick Jackson, Army Service Corps
2nd Lieutenant William Gladstone James, Royal Garrison Artillery
Temp Captain John Lewis Jenkins, Army Service Corps
Captain Stephen Spencer Jenkyns, Rifle Brigade
Lieutenant Frank Nevill Jennings, Royal Field Artillery
Temp Lieutenant Alfred Claude Jessup, Royal Engineers 
Company Sergeant Major Arthur Jess, Rifle Brigade
Captain David William John, Royal Army Medical Corps
Temp Lieutenant Alfred William Johnson, Royal Engineers
Captain Leonard Clarkson Johnson, Manchester Regiment
Lieutenant Richard Williams Johnson, Liverpool Regiment
Lieutenant Walter Percy Johnson, Royal Field Artillery
Captain Charles Evelyn Johnston, London Regiment
Temp Captain Joseph Greenfield Johnston  Royal Army Medical Corps
Temp Captain Charles George Johnstone, King's Royal Rifle Corps
Lieutenant Richard Gordon Johnstone, Royal Field Artillery
Captain Griffiths Lewis Jones, Royal Army Medical Corps
Lieutenant Harold Sutton Jones, Lancashire Fusiliers
Temp Lieutenant William Bruce Rainey Joy, Army Service Corps
Temp Lieutenant Cyril Hensman Joyce, Lincolnshire Regiment
Temp Lieutenant Ernest James Theodore Jungius, Bedfordshire Regiment, attd. Machine Gun Corps
Lieutenant Francis Beresford Katinakis, Dragoon Guards
Captain Geoffrey Lancelot Kaye, Royal Field Artillery
Captain David Keir, Army Veterinary Corps
Temp Captain Gordon Lionel Kemp, Royal Sussex Regiment
Lieutenant John Hutton Fisher Kendall, Royal Engineers
Temp Captain David Anderson Duncan Kennedy  Royal Army Medical Corps 
Quartermaster Sergeant John Wilson Kennedy, Royal Inniskilling Fusiliers (now Machine Gun Corps)
Captain Percy Macauley Ashworth Kerans, Dragoon Guards
Temp Captain Henry Birkmyre Kerr, General List
Lieutenant Harold Reginald Kerr, Army Service Corps
Captain Gerald Patrick Kidd, Royal Army Medical Corps 
Sergeant Major Alfred Kiddie  Machine Gun Corps
Captain John Kiggell, Royal Engineers
Lieutenant Remington Kirby, Royal Field Artillery 
Lieutenant Geoffrey Dugdale Kirwan, Royal Garrison Artillery
Temp Staff Sergeant Major George Knight, Army Service Corps
Temp Lieutenant Thomas Kenneth Knox, Royal Engineers 
Captain Frank Herbert Lacey, Royal Engineers
Lieutenant James Wilson Laird, Royal Engineers
Sergeant Major Herbert Laking  West Yorkshire Regiment
Temp Captain Harry Fenton Lambert, Army Service Corps
Captain Walter Peter Lambert, Connaught Rangers
Captain Charles Reginald Cambridge Lane, Indian Cavalry. 
The Rev. John Geoffrey Lane-Davies, Army Chaplains' Department
Temp Lieutenant Aristide Louis Robert Laroque, Royal Engineers
Captain Francis Seward Laskey, Manchester Regiment, seconded Tank Corps
Captain John MacDuff Latham, Highland Light Infantry
Captain Alexander Erskine Lawrence, King's Royal Rifle Corps
Lieutenant George Vernon Lawrie, Scottish Rifles
2nd Lieutenant Henry Francis Laycock, Royal Garrison Artillery
Temp Lieutenant John Laycock, Royal Engineers
Captain Francis Hemery Le Breton, Royal Field Artillery
Lieutenant John Leckie, South Staffordshire Regiment, attd. Machine Gun Corps
Sergeant Major Leonard Lee, Oxfordshire & Buckinghamshire Light Infantry 
Captain Sir John Victor Elliott Lees  King's Royal Rifle Corps
Temp 2nd Lieutenant Frederick Pyne Lenard, Tank Corps
Temp Captain Wilfrid Lenton, Army Veterinary Corps
Lieutenant Alan Liddell, Durham Light Infantry
Temp Captain Francis James Lidderdale  Royal Army Medical Corps
Temp Lieutenant Harold Stannard Ling, Machine Gun Corps
Lieutenant Charles Goodman Linnell, South Lancashire Regiment
Lieutenant Arthur Reginald Lister, Royal Artillery 
Sergeant Major Joseph Littler  Grenadier Guards
Temp Captain Wilton Llewelyn-Roberts, Army Service Corps
Lieutenant Frank Gibson Lockwood, Royal Field Artillery
The Rev. Arthur Longden, Army Chaplains' Department
Lieutenant Reginald Hollins Lord, Royal Field Artillery 
Sergeant Major Frederick Loveland, Royal Army Medical Corps
Lieutenant Charles Edward Berkeley Lowe, Royal Garrison Artillery
Lieutenant Percival Rodd Lowman, South Staffordshire Regiment, attd. Machine Gun Corps
Rev. Geoffrey Charles Lester Lunt, Army Chaplains' Department
Lieutenant Alexander Macaulay, Seaforth Highlanders
Lieutenant Alfred Oliver McCarthy, Royal Garrison Artillery
Temp Captain Norman McCannochie, Hampshire Regiment
Temp Captain Gerald McDermott, Army Service Corps
Captain Donald Christopher Macdonald  Royal Army Medical Corps
Temp Captain William James Macdonald  Royal Army Medical Corps
Lieutenant Ernest Trevor Murray McDougal, Scots Guards
Captain George McDougall, Manchester Regiment 
Hon. Lieutenant John Benjamin Macdowell, General List
Temp Captain William McEnuff, Lab. Corps
Company Sergeant Major Patrick McEvoy, Durham Light Infantry
Temp Captain John Beattie McFarland, Royal Army Medical Corps
Temp Captain Andrew Macfarlane, Highland Light Infantry
Captain David McGee, Jr., Argyll & Sutherland Highlanders
Lieutenant Eric McGregor, Royal Engineers
Temp Captain Donald Maclntyre  Royal Army Medical Corps
Temp Lieutenant Alexander Matheson McKay, Royal Engineers
Captain Charles Ion McKay, Royal Field Artillery
Temp Captain Frederick Samuel Moult McKellen, Northumberland Fusiliers
Captain William George McKenzie, Royal Army Medical Corps
Temp Captain Norman Robert McKeown
Captain William Broun Mackie, Royal Field Artillery
Sergeant Major Walter McKinney, Liverpool Regiment
Lieutenant John McLagan, London Regiment
Temp Captain Charles Allan Maclean, Argyll & Sutherland Highlanders
Captain William Farquhar McLean  Royal Army Medical Corps
Quartermaster Sergeant Alexander McLennan, Argyll & Sutherland Highlanders
Lieutenant Douglas McMaster, Royal Field Artillery
Temp Lieutenant Charles James MacPherson, General List
Lieutenant Samuel MacPherson, Cameron Highlanders
Temp Captain Kenneth Matheson Macrae, Royal Field Artillery
Lieutenant William Craig Mair, Royal Scots Fusiliers
Captain John Kenneth Maitland, Middlesex Regiment
Captain Henry Price Malcolm  Royal Army Medical Corps
Sergeant Major Walter Male, Somerset Light Infantry
Lieutenant Henry Roger Malet, Royal Garrison Artillery
Temp Captain Gilbert Gumming Manford, Highland Light Infantry
Lieutenant Thomas Howells Mann, Royal Engineers
Temp Lieutenant George Manners, General List
Temp 2nd Lieutenant William Manson, General List
Quartermaster and Hon. Captain Joseph Marr, Gordon Highlanders
Lieutenant Francis Windsor Parker Marriott, Royal Garrison Artillery
Temp Captain Cyril Wilcock Marsden, Manchester Regiment
Temp Lieutenant Cecil Wallace Marsden, Royal Munster Fusiliers
Temp Lieutenant Wilfred Walker Marsden, Royal Engineers
Temp Captain John Forsyth Marshall, Highland Light Infantry
Lieutenant John Forster Chambers Marshall, Royal Field Artillery
Lieutenant Henry Martin, Royal Field Artillery
Sergeant Major Henry Martin  Royal Garrison Artillery
Captain Wilfrid Martineau, Royal Warwickshire Regiment
Lieutenant John Isaac Mason, Royal Sussex Regiment
Lieutenant John Hamon Massey, Royal Field Artillery
Lieutenant Frank Arnold Vivante Dewar Mathews, Royal Engineers
Temp Captain Henry Aylmer Vallance Matthews, Army Service Corps
Captain Ralph Charles Matthews, Royal Lancaster Regiment
Temp Lieutenant James Henry Mauchlen, Cameron Highlanders
Temp Captain John Halliwell Mawson, Royal Engineers
Lieutenant Robert Cyril May, Royal Garrison Artillery
Lieutenant Alan Phillips Mead, Lancers
Captain James Ballantyne Meikle, Royal Field Artillery
Temp Lt Hubert William Henry Mellor, Royal Engineers
Captain Edward Emerson Melly, York and Lancaster Regiment
Captain Charles Walter Merison, Suffolk Regiment, attd. Machine Gun Corps
2nd Lieutenant John Middlebrook, Rifle Brigade
Temp Lieutenant James Shepley Middleton, Liverpool Regiment
Captain Gerald Arthur Millar, Royal Garrison Artillery
Lieutenant Arthur Axel Miller, Royal Field Artillery
Lieutenant Reginald Miller, Dorsetshire Regiment
Captain Thomas Watson Duddingston Miller, Royal Engineers
Lieutenant George Harold Mills, Welsh Regiment, attd. Machine Gun Corps
Temp Captain Charles Eric Milner, Army Service Corps
Captain William Henry Buchanan Mirrlees, Royal Field Artillery
Temp Captain Malcolm Grey Forbes Moffatt, Cameron Highlanders
Company Sergeant Major Alexander Moir, Cameron Highlanders
Captain Robert William Haines Moline, Rifle Brigade, attd. Machine Gun Corps
Captain Francis Robert Henry Mollan, Royal Army Medical Corps
Temp Captain Alan Moncrieff, Royal Engineers
Temp Captain William Moore, Royal Inniskilling Fusiliers
Lieutenant Cyril Frank Morgan, Royal Field Artillery
Temp Captain Arthur Claud Morrell, Liverpool Regiment
Lieutenant Albert Morris, Northumberland Fusiliers
Temp 2nd Lieutenant Charles Joseph Morris, Royal Engineers
Lieutenant Tankerville Robert Armine Morris, Gloucestershire Regiment
Sergeant Major Frederick Charles Morrison, Royal Army Medical Corps
Lieutenant John Morrison, Seaforth Highlanders
Lieutenant Hugh James Mortimer, Royal Garrison Artillery
Lieutenant Isaac Henry Mosley, Honourable Artillery Company
Captain William Nicholson Mossop, West Yorkshire Regiment
Lieutenant Frederick Charles Mower, Royal Field Artillery
Temp Captain Dudley Edward Mozley, Gloucestershire Regiment
2nd Lieutenant Gordon Cogill Muirhead  Gordon Highlanders
Temp Captain The Hon. Godfrey John Mulholland, Army Service Corps
Lieutenant Thomas Mulligan, Royal Field Artillery
Lieutenant Arthur Ratliffe Mulliner, Hussars
Lieutenant Thomas John Mumford, London Regiment
Temp Captain Ralph Munday, Nottinghamshire & Derbyshire Regiment
Quartermaster and Hon. Captain Donald Munro, Seaforth Highlanders
Temp Captain Ronald Neil Mackenzie Murray, Royal Highlanders
Temp Captain Thomas Joseph Mary Murray, Army Service Corps
2nd Lieutenant Percy Edward Myatt, Lab. Corps
Temp Lieutenant Frank Ivor Nash, Royal Engineers
2nd Lieutenant Albert Joseph Nation, Royal Garrison Artillery
Lieutenant Alexander Neilson, Royal Engineers
2nd Lieutenant Richard Nevins, Royal West Surrey Regiment
Quartermaster and Hon. Captain Arthur Thomas Newell, Royal Welsh Fusiliers
Sergeant Major Charles James Newman, Lancashire Fusiliers
Temp 2nd Lieutenant Alfred Leonard Nicholls, Army Service Corps
Temp Lieutenant Charles Nicholls, Royal Engineers
Temp Lieutenant Leonard Nicholls, General List
Captain Arthur Patrick Nicol, Royal Field Artillery
Captain Kenneth John Nicolson, Royal Field Artillery
Lieutenant Henry Alexander Nisbet, Spec. List
Temp Captain Graeme Nixon, Tank Corps
Lieutenant Albert George Noble, Royal Field Artillery
Temp Captain Arthur Henry Noble, Army Service Corps
Temp Captain Edward Russell Noble, West Yorkshire Regiment
Lieutenant Frank Noble, London Regiment
Temp Captain James George Gillbard Noble, Duke of Cornwall's Light Infantry
Temp Lieutenant Robert Denton Sewell Norman, Royal Engineers
Temp Captain Hugh Gordon Nourse, Royal Engineers
Captain Albert John Gladstone Dillon O'Flynn, Army Service Corps
Captain Guy Kingston Olliver, Royal West Surrey Regiment
Temp Captain Cusack O'Malley  Royal Army Medical Corps
Lieutenant William Shields O'May, Highland Light Infantry
Temp Lieutenant John Hugh Orpen, Machine Gun Corps
Captain Alec Ferguson Osborne, Army Service Corps
Temp 2nd Lieutenant John Rutherford Osmond, Royal Engineers
Company Sergeant Major Charles Oxford, Army Service Corps
Lieutenant. Edward Overton-Jonee, Coldstream Guards
Captain Ernest Dennison Black Oxley, North Staffordshire Regiment
Captain William Maingay Ozanne, West Riding Regiment
Lieutenant Henry Dennis Hall Padwick, Loyal North Lancashire Regiment 
Temp Captain John Otho Paget, Royal Sussex Regiment
Captain Leo Berkeley Paget, Rifle Brigade
Temp Sergeant Major William Joseph Parker, Royal Field Artillery
Captain Edward Mainwaring Parker-Jervis, Royal Field Artillery
Temp Captain Ebenezer Smith Lewis Parry, Royal Field Artillery
Lieutenant Walter Partington, Cheshire Regiment, seconded Tank Corps
Temp Captain Ernest Gilbert Passmore, Northamptonshire Regiment
Temp Lieutenant George Simpson Pattullo, Northumberland Fusiliers
Temp Captain Ralph Hayward Pavitt, Royal Field Artillery
Company Sergeant Major Frederick Joseph Payne, Grenadier Guards
Quartermaster and Hon. Captain Bernard Sydney Peacock, Royal Engineers
Lieutenant Charles Albert Pearce, Royal Field Artillery
2nd Lieutenant John Edward Pearce, Royal Engineers
Temp Captain Harold Fellows Pearson, Middlesex Regiment
Temp Captain Main Riversdale Pease, Durham Light Infantry
Lieutenant Arthur Horace Penn, Grenadier Guards
Lieutenant William Ronald Campbell Penney, Royal Engineers
Lieutenant John Penrose, Royal Field Artillery
Temp Captain Leonard Stanley Pentecost, Nottinghamshire & Derbyshire Regiment
Temp Captain Herbert Massingberd Pentreath, Royal Army Medical Corps
Lieutenant Bernard Huson Perl, Royal Lancaster Regiment
Lieutenant John Perrin, Royal Garrison Artillery
Lieutenant Isambard Carlyle Perrott, Lincolnshire Regiment
Lieutenant Allen Leopold Perry, Royal Field Artillery
Captain Cecil John Petherick, Hussars attd. Machine Gun Corps
Company Sergeant Major Albert Edward Pettit, Scots Guards
Company Sergeant Major Frank Edward Phillips, London Regiment
Captain Arthur Wilton Phipps, Yeomanry
Temp Lieutenant Sydney Johnson Pickard, Royal Field Artillery
2nd Lieutenant Benjamin Alfred Pidgeon, Royal Field Artillery
Temp Lieutenant Irvine Pierce, Royal Inniskilling Fusiliers
Temp Quartermaster and Hon. Captain Thomas Courtney Pierce, Manchester Regiment
Temp Lieutenant Cyril Herbert Piper, East Yorkshire Regiment
Lieutenant Frederic Michael Arthur Plant, North Staffordshire Regiment
Quartermaster and Hon. Captain Ernest Hiram John Plowright, Royal Engineers
2nd Lieutenant Rigby Pogmore, Royal Garrison Artillery
Temp Lieutenant Arthur Wilson Polden, Royal Field Artillery
Captain Leslie Albert Pollak, London Regiment, Machine Gun Corps
Quartermaster and Hon. Lieutenant Walter Morgan Porter, Monmouthshire Regiment
Temp Lieutenant David Powell, Royal Engineers
2nd Lieutenant John Beresford Powell, Royal Field Artillery
Captain Frank Pragnell, Nottinghamshire & Derbyshire Regiment
Company Sergeant Major Bell Pratt, West Yorkshire Regiment
Lieutenant Leslie Vincent Prentice, Royal Garrison Artillery
Temp Lieutenant Frederick Cecil Prickett, General List
Captain John Hedley Thornton Priestnian  Lincolnshire Regiment
Captain George Loraine Kerr Pringle  Royal Army Medical Corps
2nd Lieutenant Edward Guy Pullan, Worcestershire Regiment
Captain Richard Guy Purcell, Royal Garrison Artillery
Temp Lieutenant Douglas Edward Quick, Royal Warwickshire Regiment
Captain Eric Lawrence Rabone, Worcestershire Regiment
Temp Lieutenant Harry Ewbank Raine, Durham Light Infantry
Temp Lieutenant Cecil Malcolm Rait, Argyll & Sutherland Highlanders
Temp Lieutenant Cecil Arthur Ralph-Smith, Royal Field Artillery
Captain David Ralston, Scots Rifles, attd. Machine Gun Corps
Captain Albert Ramsbottom  Royal Army Medical Corps
Temp Captain Bryce Buchanan Ramsey, Machine Gun Corps
Temp Lieutenant Thomas Granville Randolph, Royal Engineers
Temp Lieutenant Harold Quincey Rangecroft, Royal Sussex Regiment
Lieutenant Arthur Benjamin Ransley, Royal Field Artillery
Captain John Ransom, Royal Berkshire Regiment
Lieutenant John Donaldson Rawlins, Royal Engineers
Captain Maurice Claud Raymond, Indian Cavalry
Lieutenant Charles Gordon Reed, King's Royal Rifle Corps
Temp 2nd Lieutenant Horace Alfred Reed, Suffolk Regiment
2nd Lieutenant Alan Guy Treharne Rees, Royal Field Artillery
Captain Norman Septimus Regnart, Hussars
Lieutenant Alexander Reid, Royal Engineers
Quartermaster Sergeant George Spence Reid, Gordon Highlanders
Lieutenant Robert Vernon Reid, Loyal North Lancashire Regiment
Temp Captain Ralph Stuart Renton  Royal Army Medical Corps
Temp Captain Robert Renwick, Royal Irish Rifles
Captain Douglas George Rice-Oxley, Royal Army Medical Corps
Captain Edward Francis Ommaney Richards, Lincolnshire Regiment
Sergeant Major John Given Richardson, Royal Army Medical Corps
Temp Captain Francis Paull Robathan, Army Service Corps
Company Sergeant Major Andrew Robb  Argyll & Sutherland Highlanders
Lieutenant Arthur Copleston Gay Roberts, Devonshire Regiment
Lieutenant Harry Adrian Roberts, Royal Field Artillery
Lieutenant James Edmund Roberts, Worcestershire Regiment
Temp Lieutenant Joseph Varley Roberts, Royal Engineers
Company Sergeant Major Robert Griffith Roberts, Royal Welsh Fusiliers
Lieutenant David Cameron Robertson, Royal Engineers
Temp Captain Harold John Robertson, Army Service Corps
Temp Captain Henry Arthur Robinson, General List
Temp Regimental Sergeant Major John Robinson, Leicestershire Regiment
2nd Lieutenant Lionell Keir Robinson, Royal Garrison Artillery
Lieutenant Percy Harry Robinson, Royal Garrison Artillery 
2nd Lieutenant Thomas Robinson, Hussars
Temp Captain Vivian Barry Rogers, General List
Temp Lieutenant William Alexander Rogerson, Royal Engineers
2nd Lieutenant David Ross, Argyll & Sutherland Highlanders
Temp Lieutenant George Macleod Ross, Royal Engineers
Temp Captain Robert Stewart Ross, Royal Army Medical Corps
Temp Sergeant Major Thomas Stanley Ross, South Lancashire Regiment
Temp Lieutenant John Alington Royds. Machine Gun Corps
Temp Lieutenant Wilfred Gates Rushton, General List
Lieutenant Alexander Smith Russell, Royal Garrison Artillery
Temp Lieutenant William Russell  Royal Marine Artillery
Temp 2nd Lieutenant Stanley Rutherford, East Surrey Regiment
Temp Captain William James Rutherford  Royal Army Medical Corps
Temp Staff Sergeant Major James Francis Rutter, Tank Corps
Lieutenant Henry Dudley Ryder, Royal Field Artillery
Temp Lieutenant Thomas Alfred Ryder, Royal Marine Artillery
2nd Lieutenant Harry Markey Salmon, Welsh Regiment
Lieutenant John Duncan Salmon, Cheshire Regiment
Lieutenant Henry Northcote Salter, Leicestershire Regiment
Temp Captain John Delahaye Sampson, Welsh Regiment
Captain Walter Horace Samuel, Yeomanry
Temp Captain Patrick Walter Sandeman, Royal Garrison Artillery
Temp Lieutenant Erland Russell Sanders, Tank Corps
Temp Lieutenant John William Sands, Royal Engineers
Company Sergeant Major Archibald Sandy, Rifle Brigade
Lieutenant John Mildred Sanger, Royal Field Artillery
Lieutenant Leslie Boulter Saunders, Royal Field Artillery
2nd Lieutenant Hubert Vane Schofield, Royal Horse and Royal Field Artillery
Lieutenant George Ernest Schuster, Yeomanry
Sergeant Major Anthony Scorer, Northumberland Fusiliers
Captain Francis James Scott, Dragoon Guards
Captain Herbert Stewart Lauriston Scott, Hussars
Staff Sergeant Major Walter Percy Scott, Army Service Corps
Quartermaster and Hon. Lieutenant George Sellex, Royal Army Medical Corps
Captain Clement Perronet Sells, Royal Army Medical Corps
2nd Lieutenant Harry Shandley, Royal Garrison Artillery
Captain John James Mclntosh Shaw  Royal Army Medical Corps
Lieutenant Thomas Shearer, Scottish Rifles
Temp Captain Simpson Shepherd, Royal Engineers
Temp Captain Charles John de Bunsen Sheringham, General List
Temp 2nd Lieutenant John Henry Shields, Royal Engineers
Captain John Simonds, Royal Field Artillery
Captain Edward Swan Simpson  Royal Army Medical Corps
Lieutenant Alexander Dickson Sinclair, Scottish Rifles
Lieutenant Richard Millington Sing, Royal Field Artillery
Lieutenant John William Bernard Skelton, Royal Garrison Artillery
Quartermaster and Hon. Lieutenant James Small, Machine Gun Corps, formerly Gloucestershire Regiment
Temp Captain Arthur Archibald Smee, Suffolk Regiment
Temp Lieutenant Colin Smee, Middlesex Regiment
Temp Quartermaster and Hon. Captain Alexander Smith, Royal Scots
Temp Lieutenant Adam Clayton Smith, General List
Lieutenant Alfred James Smith, North Lancashire Regiment
Captain Arnold John Hugh Smith, Coldstream Guards 
Lieutenant Clifford Charles Fox Smith, Royal Irish Regiment
Company Sergeant Major Charles Henry Smith, London Regiment
Captain Evan Cadogan Eric Smith, Lancers 
The Rev. Ernest Whateley Smith, Army Chaplains' Department
Temp Lieutenant Herbert Somerville-Smith, Royal Field Artillery
Company Sergeant Major Matthew Arnold Smith, Durham Light Infantry
Captain Richard Smith, York and Lancaster Regiment
Lieutenant Ralph Allen Oscroft Smith, Devonshire Regiment
Lieutenant Stanley Smith, Royal Garrison Artillery
Temp Lieutenant Stanley Arthur Smith, Tank Corps
Temp Captain St. John Robert Eyre Smith, Army Service Corps
2nd Lieutenant Samuel John Smith, Royal Field Artillery
Lieutenant Wilfred Cabourn Smith, King's Royal Rifle Corps
Temp Lieutenant William Leslie Smith, Worcestershire Regiment
Captain Eric George Snaith, Leicestershire Regiment
Captain Rupert Ernest Fowler Sneath, London Regiment
Lieutenant Robert Bernard Solomon, Royal Field Artillery
Temp Lieutenant Edmund William Spalding, Royal Garrison Artillery
Lieutenant Arthur Gerald Bayfield Spear, Royal Field Artillery 
Captain Elmer John Leyland Speed, L. Guards
Lieutenant Thomas Reginald Carwardine Spence, Royal Scots
Captain Robert Spencer, Yeomanry
Temp Captain Arthur Spray, Tank Corps
Lieutenant Eustace Lawry Squance, Royal Field Artillery
Company Sergeant Major George Henry Stacey, East Surrey Regiment
Temp Captain Herbert Claude Stanford, Intell. Corps, General List
Temp Lieutenant Mark Stanford, General List
Temp Quartermaster and Hon. Captain Robert Starling, Suffolk Regiment
Temp Sub-Lieutenant Frederick Witton Stear 
2nd Lieutenant Harold Ernest Stearns, Royal Garrison Artillery, Spec. Ree
Temp 2nd Lieutenant George Steel, Machine Gun Corps
Lieutenant William Harold Stephenson, Durham Light Infantry
Captain George Henderson Stevenson  Royal Army Medical Corps
Lieutenant Alan Josiah Steward, Royal Garrison Artillery
Temp Lieutenant John Livingstone Stewart, Argyll & Sutherland Highlanders
Sergeant Major James. Stuart Robson Stewart, Rifle Brigade
Lieutenant William Roland Stewart, Royal Engineers
Lieutenant Clarence Stott, West Riding Regiment
Temp Captain Ernest Frederick Strachan, General List
Temp Captain Francis James Stratten, Middlesex Regiment
Lieutenant Kenneth Forbes Glascott Stronach, Royal Field Artillery
2nd Lieutenant Haydn- Stubbing, London Regiment
Company Sergeant Major Henry Stubbins, East Yorkshire Regiment 
The Rev. Frank Leslie Sugget, Army Chaplains' Department 
Company Sergeant Major Daniel Sullivan, North Staffordshire Regiment 
Quartermaster and Temp Hon. Lieutenant Albert Charles Summerfield, King's Royal Rifle Corps
Temp Captain Andrew Theodore Sumner, Royal Engineers
Temp Captain David Macbeth Sutherland, Royal Scots
Quartermaster and Temp Hon.Lieutenant Basil Fitzroy Swain, Royal Sussex Regiment
Temp Lieutenant John Kirby Swales, Royal Engineers
Temp Captain Cecil Victor Swan, Army Service Corps
Lieutenant Robert Allan Swinton, Royal Field Artillery
Temp Captain Arthur George Symons, Middlesex Regiment
Temp Lieutenant Alexander Tait, Royal Engineers
Temp S.Sergeant Major Robert Henry Tamlyn, Army Service Corps
Lieutenant Leonard Beaumont Tansley, Royal Field Artillery
Captain Michael John Tapper, London Regiment, attd. Tank Corps
2nd Lieutenant George Edmund Tatham, Royal Field Artillery
Lieutenant Eric Eyre Sullivan Taylor, Nottinghamshire & Derbyshire Regiment
Lieutenant James Taylor, South Lancashire Regiment
Temp Regimental Sergeant Major Edward Samuel Terry, Royal Field Artillery
Temp Lieutenant Sidney Frederick Terry, Wiltshire Regiment 
Battery Sergeant Major Albert Orlando Tew, Royal Field Artillery 
Captain Francis Geoffrey Thatcher  Royal Army Medical Corps
Temp Captain Launcelot Theodore Charlton Thatcher, Army Service Corps
Temp 2nd Lieutenant Herbert James Thorn, Royal Scots
Temp Lieutenant Edward Thomas, Machine Gun Corps
Temp 2nd Lieutenant Robert Stanley Thomas, Worcestershire Regiment
Temp Captain Benjamin Cyril Thompson, Royal Garrison Artillery
Temp Lieutenant Christopher Thompson, Royal Field Artillery 
Temp 2nd Lieutenant John Thomson, Northumberland Fusiliers
Temp Lieutenant Archibald Thorburn, Royal Engineers
Temp Captain Francis Bodenham Thornely, Royal Irish Rifles
Temp Captain John Hardwick Thornley  Royal Army Medical Corps
Temp Captain Roland Hobhouse Thornton, General List
Temp Lieutenant James Allan Thurstan, Tank Corps
Captain Jeffery Marsland Thwaites, Royal Field Artillery
Temp 2nd Lieutenant Reginald Tivey, North Staffordshire Regiment
Lieutenant Claude Tirand, Royal Berkshire Regiment, Intell. Corps
Temp Captain James Arnaud Tobin  Royal Army Medical Corps
Lieutenant Alan Leslie Tosland, Royal Warwickshire Regiment
Temp 2nd Lieutenant Charles Eric Townsend, Royal Field Artillery
2nd Lieutenant Stanley Prosser Tredinnick, London Regiment
Lieutenant John Trehane, Duke of Cornwall's Light Infantry
Captain Stewart Jack le Poer Trench, Yeomanry
Temp Lieutenant Paul Triefus, Royal Field Artillery
Company Sergeant Major James Trimmer, Seaforth Highlanders
Lieutenant Edward Trudgill  Royal Horse and Royal Field Artillery
Captain William Guise Tucker, Royal Engineers
Lieutenant Archibald Turnbull, Royal Scots Fusiliers
Temp Lieutenant Maxwell Turnbull, Border Regiment
Captain George Charlewood Turner, London Regiment
Captain William Arthur Scales Turner, Royal Field Artillery
Captain Herbert Broke Turnor, Lancers
Temp Lieutenant Alfred Ernest Turpin, Royal Artillery
Temp Lieutenant Arthur Tyler, Army Service Corps
Captain John Crammond Urquhart, Lincolnshire Regiment
Temp Captain Vernon Watkins Urquhart, Army Ordnance Depot
Temp Lieutenant Douglas Uzielli, General List
Sergeant Major Henry John Vatcher, South Wales Borderers
Lieutenant Arthur Douglas Vaughan, Seaforth Highlanders, attd. Machine Gun Corps
Lieutenant Leslie Reginald Vaughan, Royal Engineers
Lieutenant Leslie James Coleman Vidler, Royal West Surrey Regiment
Temp Lieutenant Geoffrey Vipan, Royal Engineers
Temp Captain Henry Theodore Wade-Gery, Lancashire Fusiliers
Lieutenant Walter William Wadsworth, Royal Field Artillery
Lieutenant Dennis Edward Francis Waight, Northumberland Fusiliers
Lieutenant Owen Wakeford, Royal Garrison Artillery
Sergeant Major Thomas Henry Waldren, Royal Inniskilling Fusiliers
Temp Sub Lieutenant Cyril Gordon Walker 
Lieutenant Maurice Cecil Walker, Royal Garrison Artillery
Lieutenant Philip Howard Walker, Royal Field Artillery
2nd Lieutenant Stanley Walker, Royal Horse and Royal Field Artillery
2nd Lieutenant William Henry Walker, Royal Garrison Artillery
Captain William McNeill Walker, Royal Army Medical Corps
Captain Thomas Leetham Wall, Lancers
Captain David Euan Wallace, Life Guards
Lieutenant Bertram James Wallington, Royal Field Artillery
Lieutenant Eric Arthur Underwood Ward, Royal Engineers
Company Sergeant Major Frederick Arthur Ward, South Staffordshire Regiment
Captain Robert Ogier Ward, Royal Field Artillery
Quartermaster Sergeant Cecil Waring, Royal Welsh Fusiliers
Temp Captain Christopher Prioleau Warren, Rifle Brigade
Temp Captain Arthur Powell Watkins, Worcestershire Regiment
Sergeant Major Abraham Watson  King's Royal Rifle Corps
Lieutenant James Harvey Long Watson, Leinster Regiment
Temp Lieutenant John Watson, General List
Temp Captain John Watson  Royal Army Medical Corps
Temp Captain William Esplen Watson, Royal Field Artillery
Temp Lieutenant James Edward Watt, Army Corps of Clerks
Lieutenant Murray Hamilton Webb-Peploe, Royal Garrison Artillery
Temp Captain Alexander Urquhart Webster  Royal Army Medical Corps
Lieutenant Frederick Webster, Royal Engineers
Temp Lieutenant Cyril Warner Weekes, Royal Field Artillery
Lieutenant Thomas Henderson Weir, Royal Engineers
2nd Lieutenant Sidney Howard Welch, Royal Field Artillery
Company Sergeant Major Charles Wells  Dorsetshire Regiment
Captain Stanley Stephen Wenman, Royal Garrison Artillery
Temp Captain Edward Maurice West, Army Service Corps
Lieutenant Lionel Ernest Howard Whitby, Royal West Kent Regiment, Machine Gun Corps
Temp Captain Archie Cecil Thomas White  General List
Temp Captain Francis Herbert White, Yorkshire Light Infantry
Lieutenant Harry Plant White, Cheshire Regiment
2nd Lieutenant Lawrence Arthur White, Royal Field Artillery
2nd Lieutenant Taliesyn Gwyn White, Welsh Regiment
Temp Lieutenant Walter Frederick Sidney White, Army Service Corps
Lieutenant Francis Mussenden Whitmore-Smith, Dragoon Guards
Temp Captain Frederick William Whitaker, West Yorkshire Regiment
Lieutenant Claude Horatio Wilkins, Sussex Regiment
Temp 2nd Lieutenant Charles Wilkinson, Royal Engineers
Captain Benjamin Bruce Willcox, London Regiment
Captain Kingsley Willett, Royal Field Artillery
2nd Lieutenant Allan John Williams, Royal Garrison Artillery
Temp Captain Hubert Francis Llewellyn Williams, Machine Gun Corps
Lieutenant Ronald Douglas Williams, Royal Irish Rifles
Temp Captain Richard Earl Williams, Tank Corps
Lieutenant Thomas James Williams, Royal Field Artillery
Captain Edgar Arthur Wilson, North Staffordshire Regiment
Quartermaster Sergeant John Cruickshanks Wilson, Seaforth Highlanders
Lieutenant John Wilson, Machine Gun Corps
2nd Lieutenant John Hathaway Wilson, London Regiment
Lieutenant Ronald Gordon Maclean Wilson, Royal Engineers
Temp Captain William Storey Wilson, Royal Highlanders
Quartermaster Sergeant Frederick Wiltshire, South Wales Borderers
Captain Douglas Neil Wimberley, Cameron Highlanders, Machine Gun Corps
Captain Geoffrey Edward Wingfield-Stratford, Royal West Kent Regiment
Lieutenant Leonard Mostyn Winn, Essex Regiment
2nd Lieutenant Edward Micklem Winterbotham, Royal Garrison Artillery
Captain John Evered Witt, Army Service Corps
Captain Ronald Guy Pearson Wood, Dragoon Guards
Temp Quartermaster and Hon. Lieutenant William Wool, Hampshire Regiment
Staff Sergeant Major Arthur Woplard, Army Service Corps
2nd Lieutenant Herbert Smith Woolley, Royal Garrison Artillery
Temp Lieutenant Leonard Brooke Woolley, Royal Engineers
Lieutenant George Edward Wright, Royal Fusiliers
Lieutenant Harry Wright, Gordon Highlanders
Temp Lieutenant John Armer Wright, Royal Sussex Regiment
Captain Kenneth Valentine Wright, Royal Field Artillery
Captain Charles Edward Wurtzburg, Liverpool Regiment
Captain James Digby Wyatt, Northamptonshire Regiment
Quartermaster and Hon. Captain Harry Yates, Royal Welsh Fusiliers
Lieutenant Harold Yeatman, South Staffordshire Regiment
Temp 2nd Lieutenant John Yellowlees, Durham Light Infantry
Captain Frederick Augustus Yorke, Royal Garrison Artillery
Lieutenant Sydney Yorston, Cheshire Regiment
Temp Lieutenant Edward John Young, Royal West Surrey Regiment 
Lieutenant Sidney Bell Young, Royal Garrison Artillery
Captain Leigh Norman Younghusband, Royal Artillery

Canadian Force
Captain William Hamilton Abbott, Field Artillery
Captain Clifford Maxwell Ackland, Saskatchewan Regiment
Lieutenant William Boydon Adams, West Ontario Regiment 
Sergeant Major George William Allen, Field Artillery
Lieutenant Thomas Howard Atkinson, Field Artillery
Lieutenant Douglas Hume Balmain, West Ontario Regiment 
Hon. Captain and Quartermaster Alfred Albert Edward Batchelor, Saskatchewan Regiment 
Sergeant Major Samuel John Bennett, Central Ontario Regiment
Captain George Gooderham Blackstock, Field Artillery
Captain George Frederick Daniels Bond, Saskatchewan Regiment
Lieutenant John Gundry Church, Central Ontario Regiment
Lieutenant Arthur Clarke, Mounted Rifles Battalion, Central Ontario Regiment
Rev. Harry Bertram Clarke, Canadian Chaplains' Service
Lieutenant Edward Grey Clarkson, Central Ontario Regiment
Lieutenant Norman Victor Cliff, Central Ontario Regiment
Lieutenant Michael Cook  Manitoba Regiment
Lieutenant Gerald Hanson Davidson, Field Artillery
Captain Eric Radford Maxwell Davis, Central Ontario Regiment
Sergeant Major Joseph Depper  Saskatchewan Regiment
Quartermaster and Hon. Captain George Tomlinson Dodge, Quebec Regiment
Sergeant Major Thomas Double, Field Artillery
Temp Captain Leonard Vivien Drummond-Hay, East Ontario Regiment
Captain William Theodore Ewing, Army Medical Corps
Captain Harold Arthur Fowler, Machine Gun Corps
Lieutenant Lionel George Francis, Machine Gun Corps
Lieutenant Ernest Edward Guille, British Columbia Regiment
Captain Arthur Hartley, Engineers
Sergeant Major Howe Hewlett, Mounted Rifles Battalion
Captain Rufus Clements Holden, Army Service Corps
Lieutenant Harry Shaw Holloway, Engineers
Lieutenant Powell Nicholas-Horton, Central Ontario Regiment
Lieutenant Wilfred Henry Jolliffe, Central Ontario Regiment
Lieutenant Harold Samuel Kennedy, Engineers
Captain Michael Patrick Kennedy, Army Veterinary Corps
Captain Shirley Thompson, Layton, Garrison Artillery
Captain Edward Oswald Leadlay, Army Service Corps
Lieutenant Harold John Mackenzie, Engineers
Lieutenant Douglas James Maxwell, Garrison Artillery
Lieutenant Joseph McAmmond, West Ontario Regiment
Captain James McDermid, Manitoba Regiment
Captain Alexander McNeil McFaul, Machine Gun Corps
Captain Frederick Arthur McGiverin, Engineers
Lieutenant Henry Campbell McMordie, Engineers
Lieutenant James Learmonth Melville, Engineers
Lieutenant Fred James Mills, Field Artillery
Captain John Broughton Mitchell, Alberta Regiment
Temp Lieutenant Bernard Eric Moberly, Railway Construction Corps
Captain Henry William Morgan, Quebec Regiment
Lieutenant Charles Ayre Morris, Engineers
Lieutenant Abram Rupert Neelands, Engineers
Captain Stanley Holland Okell, British Columbia Regiment
Lieutenant Eric Osborne, Machine Gun Corps
Lieutenant Ronald Roy Parker, Central Ontario Regiment
Lieutenant Samuel Rutherford Parker, Engineers
Captain David Paton, East Ontario Regiment
Captain William Melanethelon Pearce, Machine Gun Corps
Lieutenant Arthur Pritchard, British Columbia Regiment
Captain Walter Lionel Rawlinson, Field Artillery
Lieutenant Charles Edward Read, 1st Central Ontario Regiment
Captain James Wilbert Reith, Manitoba Regiment
Lieutenant Allen Gilmour Richmond, Cycling Battalion
Lieutenant Ernest Otto Rietchel, Manitoba Regiment
Lieutenant Robert Swan Robertson, Manitoba Regiment
Captain Robert Porteous Saunders, Central Ontario Regiment
Captain Lawrence William Webster Slack, Quebec
Lieutenant Thomas Hammond Stegman, Central Ontario Regiment
Captain John Franklin Sterns, Garrison Artillery
Lieutenant Daniel Lionel Teed, Field Artillery
Captain Charles Gardner Burton Thompson, Royal Canadian Regiment, Nova Scotia Regiment
Captain Norman Albert Thompson, Field Artillery
Temp Captain Charles Beresford Topp, Quebec Regiment
Lieutenant Alfred James Wall, East Ontario Regiment
Lieutenant Clarence Gladstone Weeks, Central Ontario Regiment
Lieutenant William Thomas Wilson, Engineers
Captain Samuel Fraser Workman, Engineers
Lieutenant John Albert Young, Engineers

Australian Imperial Force
Lieutenant John Adams, Infantry
Captain Roy Douglas Bartram, Army Medical Corps
Captain Leonard Lassetter Beauchamp, Infantry
Captain John Gillies Bolton, Infantry
Captain James Brack, Infantry
Lieutenant Joseph Edward Brown, Infantry
Lieutenant Percival Henry Brown, Infantry
Lieutenant James Bull, Infantry
Lieutenant Leslie Frank Burgess, Engineers
Lieutenant Stanley Clarence Butler, Infantry
Lieutenant Beresford Henry Cairnes, Artillery
Captain George Carroll, Infantry
Lieutenant Sydney Hubert Carroll, Machine Gun Corps
Lieutenant Edward Wallis Carter, Army Service Corps
Lieutenant George Box Carter, Infantry
Captain Ernest John Chenery, Field Artillery
Captain Frank Lothian Cheshire, Infantry
Lieutenant Alec Leslie Rutherford Chomley, Field Artillery
Lieutenant Mortimer Carr Clark, Field Artillery
Captain Arthur Francis Cohen, Engineers
Captain Henry Alfred Cook, Army Service Corps
Lieutenant Thomas Robinson Collier, Engineers
Lieutenant Thomas Leo Corcoran, Infantry
Captain Leslie Charles Andrew Craig, Infantry
Captain Harry Cross, Infantry
Captain Alexander Jackson Cunningham, Engineers
Lieutenant Edward Maurice Cullimore, Machine Gun Corps
Captain Ernest Davies, Infantry
Rev. Walter Ernest Dexter  Australian Chaplain
Lieutenant Percy Walter Dobson, Artillery
Lieutenant Roy Doutreband, Infantry
Captain Arthur Herbert Dow, Engineers
Captain William John Earle, Infantry
Lieutenant Alexander Telfer Ewart  Engineers
Lieutenant Roy John Fidler, Engineers
Lieutenant George Lush Finlay, Infantry
Lieutenant Arthur Wilfred Finlayson, Infantry
Quartermaster and Hon. Lieutenant Richard John Forrest, Infantry
Captain Charles William Scott French, Infantry
Captain Herbert Roy Gollan, Infantry
Lieutenant Kenny Arnot Goodland, Infantry
Captain William James Gordon, Infantry
Quartermaster and Hon. Captain Carl Beeston Gow, Infantry
Lieutenant John Gray, Infantry
Captain Albert Edward Halstead, Infantry
Lieutenant Oliver John Edward Harris, Infantry
Captain Stanley William Hawkins, Infantry
Captain James Arthur Hillman, Engineers
Captain Ronald Butler Hinder, Engineers
Captain John Miller Hogg, Machine Gun Corps
Captain James Peter Wallace Hogg, Infantry
Quartermaster and Hon. Captain Herbert Sydney Hudd, Infantry
Captain Samuel Henry Jackson, Infantry
Captain Wilfred Oldfield Jackson, Field Artillery
Lieutenant Frederick John Jenkins  Infantry
Captain Ivan Bede Jose, Army Medical Corps
Captain Roy Lamble, Infantry
Lieutenant Leslie Layton-Smith, Infantry
Lieutenant Reginald Phelps Little  Infantry
Lieutenant James Norman Baker Loudon, Infantry
Quartermaster and Hon. Captain Sidney Lewis Mclntyre, Infantry
Captain Harold Eric Maclennon, Infantry
Lieutenant Norman Gordon McNicol, Infantry
Captain Norman Reginald Mathews, Army Medical Corps
Captain Edwin Leslie Medlyn, Army Service Corps
Captain Thomas Millar, Infantry
Lieutenant Thomas Ramsay Miller, Infantry
Quartermaster and Hon. Lieutenant Leonard Molloy, Infantry
Captain Alban George Moyes, Infantry
Lieutenant Norman James Nangle, Engineers
Captain Alfred Douglas Nevien, Infantry
Lieutenant James Francis O'Rouke, Field Artillery
Lieutenant Sydney Lewis Patterson, Infantry
Quartermaster and Hon. Captain Reginald Powell, Infantry
Captain Cyril Richard Rigg, Artillery
Lieutenant Leonard Charles Robson, Infantry
Rev. Francis William Rolland  Army Chaplains' Department 
Quartermaster and Hon. Lieutenant Leslie William Rosen, Infantry
Captain Henry Gordon Rourke, Field Artillery
Captain Cedric Murray Samson, Army Medical Corps
Captain Cyril Robert Seelenmeyer, Army Veterinary Corps
Captain Leonard Greville Sewell, Machine Gun Corps
Captain Henry Richard Shalders, Field Artillery
Captain John Alexander Shanasy, Army Medical Corps
Captain Walter Edmond Smith, Infantry
Quartermaster and Hon. Captain Henry Edward Spotswood, Infantry
Captain Colin Gore Stewart, Field Artillery
Lieutenant Leonard Robert Stillman, Infantry
Captain Norman William Sundercombe, Infantry
Captain Reymond Synnot, Field Artillery
Captain Richard Tambling, Infantry
Captain Harry Thomson, Infantry
Lieutenant Oswald William Turner, Infantry
Captain George Stanley Vanstan, Infantry
Captain Eric Sydney Walpole Sealy Vidal, Infantry
Captain William James Waddell, Army Service Corps
Lieutenant Arthur Waring, Engineers
Lieutenant James Lauder Watt, Infantry
Lieutenant George Hubert Wilkins, General List
Captain William Thomas Wilkinson, Infantry
Lieutenant Robert Trevor Williams, Infantry
Lieutenant Herbert Ward Wilson, Infantry 
Captain Charles Burton Withy, Infantry

New Zealand Force
Captain Philip Blaxland Benham, New Zealand Military Corps
Lieutenant Charles Cairn Best, Rifle Brigade
Captain Lachlan Bain Campbell, Engineers
Captain Robert Bruce Caws, Machine Gun Corps
Captain Albert Arthur Chapman, Pioneer Battalion
Lieutenant Philip Brunskill Cooke, Engineers
Lieutenant Silston Cory-Wright, Engineers
Lieutenant Hugh Edward Crosse, Wellington Regiment
Captain William Forrest Fowlds, Rifle Brigade
Captain Harold Sherbrooke Gabites, Canterbury Regiment
Captain Loftus Joseph Gibbs, Canterbury Regiment
Captain Chilton Hayter, Machine Gun Corps
2nd Lieutenant Allen Henry King, Otago Regiment
Lieutenant Archibald Campbell Macdonald, Field Artillery
Lieutenant John Murdoch Campbell McLeod, Canterbury Regiment
Lieutenant Horace William Newman, Engineers
Lieutenant William John Organ, Rifle Brigade
Lieutenant Charles Oxenham, Auckland Regiment
Lieutenant Frederick Coates Pascoe, Otago Regiment
Captain John Norman Rauch, Wellington Regiment
Lieutenant Laurence John Rowe, Rifle Brigade
Captain Peter William Gordon Spiers, Otago Regiment
Lieutenant Frederick Stewart, Auckland Regiment
Captain Alexander Thomson, Rifle Brigade
Lieutenant Robert Tilsley, Auckland Regiment
Captain John Franklin Tonkin, Canterbury Regiment
Lieutenant John George Concanon Wales, Canterbury Regiment
Lieutenant Edward Russ Winkler, Field Artillery

South African Force
Quartermaster and Hon. Lieutenant William Henry Carding, South African Infantry
Temp Lieutenant Frederick Lyster Dobson, Royal Engineers
Temp Lieutenant James Jack, Royal Engineers
Temp Lieutenant Walter Stanley Lunn, Royal Garrison Artillery
Lieutenant Arthur William Frederick Roper, Royal Garrison Artillery
Company Sergeant Major Joseph Wood, Infantry

Newfoundland Force
Temp Lieutenant James Miffin, Royal Newfoundland Regiment

For distinguished service in connection with Military Operations in Salonika—
Temp. 2nd Lieutenant Roger Addison, East Lancashire Regiment
Captain William Dinsdale Anderton  Royal Army Medical Corps
Lieutenant George Waring Ashby, Duke of Cornwall's Light Infantry
Temp. Lieutenant William Reginald Batty, Manchester Regiment
Temp. Captain Richard Edward Bruce Beal, Army Service Corps
Lieutenant Desmond William Beamish, Royal Army Medical Corps
Temp. Captain Robert George Beer, Royal Engineers
Lieutenant Robert Godfrey Wolseley Bewicke-Copley, King's Royal Rifle Corps and Machine Gun Corps
Temp. Lieutenant Christopher St. John Bird, Royal Engineers
Temp. Lieutenant Geoffrey Dumaresq Boissier, Oxfordshire and Buckinghamshire Light Infantry
The Rev. Joseph Morris Bold, Army Chaplains' Department
Temp. Lieutenant Quintin Bone, Royal Lancaster Regiment
Temp. Lieutenant Cecil James Bremner, East Kent Regiment
Temp. Lieutenant William Henry Brown, Royal Engineers
Temp. Captain Ernest James Burndred, Army Veterinary Corps
Lieutenant John Owen Carpenter, East Surrey Regiment
Temp. Lieutenant William Gilbert Carter, Royal Engineers
Lieutenant Francis Charles Frederick Cleeve, Royal Field Artillery
Temp. Lieutenant Frederic Alfred Clemo, Duke of Cornwall's Light Infantry
2nd Lieutenant Benjamin Cliff, Scottish Rifles
Captain Sidney Collingwood, Royal Garrison Artillery
Temp. Captain Harold Cooper, Royal Field Artillery
Captain Cecil Cotton, Army Service Corps
Temp. Lieutenant James Lawson Cowie, Wiltshire Regiment
Captain Dudley Alfred Cox, East Yorkshire Regiment
Captain Eugene Henry Coyne  Royal Army Medical Corps
Captain George Lillie Craik, Yeomanry
Temp. Captain Charles Neville Crawshaw, Royal Scots Fusiliers
Captain Roger Crofton, Royal Garrison Artillery
Temp. Lieutenant Sherley Dale, Royal Berkshire Regiment
2nd Lieutenant Laurence Darvall, Yorkshire Regiment
Lieutenant Tudor Huab Davies, Royal Engineers
Temp. Captain Henry Harvard Davis, Royal Army Medical Corps
Temp. 2nd Lieutenant Robert Conn Dick, Royal Engineers
Lieutenant William Alfred Dixon, Suffolk Regiment
Captain Laurence Rivers Dunne, King's Royal Rifle Corps and Machine Gun Corps
Lieutenant James Edelston, Royal Garrison Artillery
Temp. Captain Leslie Wilson Evans  Royal Army Medical Corps
Captain John Arthur Fearnside, Army Veterinary Corps
Lieutenant Gilbert Edward Fenwick, Northumberland Fusiliers
Temp. Lieutenant Harold James Fisher, Worcestershire Regiment
Temp. Lieutenant Walter Foskett, Manchester Regiment
Lieutenant John Sharman Franey, Royal Field Artillery
2nd Lieutenant Fred Franks, Lancashire Fusiliers
Temp. Lieutenant Frank Garland, Duke of Cornwall's Light Infantry
Lieutenant Peter Gaskell, Argyll and Sutherland Highlanders
2nd Lieutenant Edward Gordon Gedge, Royal Field Artillery
Temp. Captain John Harrison Dashwood Goldie, Wiltshire Regiment
Temp. Captain Christopher Sellhouse Gorton, Cheshire Regiment
Temp. Lieutenant Arthur Trevor Gough, Royal Field Artillery
Captain Charles Christopher Grattan-Bellew, King's Royal Rifle Corps
Temp. Captain Geoffrey Clarence Hagger, Royal Field Artillery
Temp. Captain Thomas Winlack Harley, Royal Lancaster Regiment
Temp. Lieutenant Herbert Elwin Harris, Shropshire Light Infantry
Temp. Captain Claude Charles Harrison  Royal Army Medical Corps
Captain Kenneth Eugene Hart, Royal West Surrey Regiment
Lieutenant Harry Gordon Hartje, Cheshire Regiment
Captain Ralph Anstruther Crompton Henderson, Cameron Highlanders
Lieutenant David Halliday Hepburn, Royal Garrison Artillery
Temp. Lieutenant Thomas Howard Hetherington, Hampshire Regiment
Captain Hugh Middleton Heyder, Northumberland Fusiliers
Temp. Lieutenant Frederick Julian Homer, Royal Warwickshire Regiment
Temp. Captain Philip Robert Hughes, Royal Field Artillery
Temp. Lieutenant Donald Esme Isaac-lnnes, Royal Engineers
Lieutenant Owen Richard Jenkyn, Gloucestershire Regiment
Temp. Lieutenant Basil Jennings-Bramly, Royal Field Artillery
Lieutenant George Ephraim Johnson, Royal Field Artillery
Lieutenant Alexander Joyce, Middlesex Regiment
Captain Angus John Aitchison Kennedy, Yeomanry
Captain Walter Holman Kennett, Rifle Brigade
Temp. Lieutenant Eric Sidney Kirk, Border Regiment
Lieutenant Richard Arthur Lees Knowles, King's Royal Rifle Corps
Lieutenant Francis Farwell Labouchère-Sparling, Royal Garrison Artillery
Temp. Lieutenant Frank Milner Leighton, Welsh Regiment
Captain William Ashley Lethem  Royal Army Medical Corps
Temp. Lieutenant Victor Greville Lewis, Hampshire Regiment (Capt., South African Defence Force)
Temp. Lieutenant Harold Burt Locke, Royal Garrison Artillery
Captain Neville Hadley Bernard Lyon, Middlesex Regiment
Lieutenant William John Conybeare Macaulay, King's Royal Rifle Corps
Captain Ian Gordon Macbean, Nottinghamshire and Derbyshire Regiment
Captain Fergus Macdonald, Army Service Corps
Captain Alexander John Lindsay Macgregor, Yeomanry
Temp. Captain Ernest Campbell Mackellar, Army Service Corps
Captain Kenneth Edward Birdee Mackenzie-Kennedy, North Staffordshire Regiment
2nd Lieutenant Brice Bunny Mackinnon, Royal Highlanders
Temp. Lieutenant Primrose McConnell, Royal Field Artillery
Rev. Robert McGuinness, Army Chaplains' Department
Captain John Lawrence McLennan, Army Service Corps
Lieutenant William Henry Morrison, Yeomanry
Temp. Captain Roger John Kynaston Mott, Special List
Temp. Captain Eli Page, Royal Field Artillery
Temp. Lieutenant John Charles Palmer, East Lancashire Regiment
Temp. Lieutenant Percy Caleb Cooper Parry, Royal Field Artillery
Lieutenant Francis Rudolph Phillips, Yeomanry
Temp. Captain Arthur Grosvenor Piddington, Royal Field Artillery
Temp. Lieutenant Charles Reginald Redgrave, Machine Gun Corps
Temp. Captain George Hamilton Richards, Royal Engineers
Temp. Captain Harold George Rickwood, Royal Lancaster Regiment
Temp. Captain John William Riddoch  Royal Army Medical Corps
Captain Frank Hubert Robbins, Royal Army Medical Corps
Lieutenant William Robertson, Argyll and Sutherland Highlanders
Rev. Thomas Henry Foorde Russell Buckworth Royse, Army Chaplains' Department
Captain George Rivers Russell, Royal Field Artillery
2nd Lieutenant Robert Bruys Sandilands, East Kent Regiment
Captain Richard Montagu Lawrence Scott, Cheshire Regiment
Captain William Scott-Watson, Royal Field Artillery
Captain Frank Scroggie  Royal Army Medical Corps
Temp. Lieutenant Martin Hollis Shanks, Suffolk Regiment and Machine Gun Corps
Captain Robert Glen Shaw  Royal Army Medical Corps
Lieutenant Frederick Francis Cherrett Shepherd, Royal Field Artillery
Lieutenant George Gerard Shiel, Northumberland Fusiliers, and Machine Gun Corps
Temp. Lieutenant Kenneth Graham Sillar, Royal Engineers
Temp. Lieutenant James Skelton Smith, Royal Engineers
Temp. Captain James Parker Stephenson-Jellie, Army Ordnance Depot
Temp. Captain The Hon. Arthur Stuart, Machine Gun Corps
Temp. Captain Charles Isaac Sutton, Royal Field Artillery
Captain Archer Edward Tawney, Royal Garrison Artillery
Captain Charles Clifford Tee, Royal Irish Rifles and Machine Gun Corps
Temp. Captain Austin Gilchrist Thompson, South Lancashire Regiment
Lieutenant William Howard Sandberg Tripp, Royal Engineers
Temp. Captain Robert James Truter, Army Service Corps
Temp. Lieutenant Harold Edgar Kenrick Wakefield, Royal Engineers
Captain Claude Errington Wales, York and Lancaster Regiment
Lieutenant Robert Peel Waller, Royal Field Artillery
Captain Valentine Hutchinson Wardle, Royal Army Medical Corps
Temp. 2nd Lieutenant Thomas Watson, Royal Engineers
Temp. Lieutenant James Leslie Webster, Royal Garrison Artillery
Temp. Lieutenant Hubert Victor Whittall, Spec. List
Temp. Captain Valentine Wilkinson, Border Regiment
Temp. Lieutenant Frederick Theophilus Williams, South Wales Borderers
Temp. Captain James Leslie Dowker Williamson, attd. East Yorkshire Regiment
Lieutenant Alan Wood, Royal Artillery
Lieutenant John Edward Wood, Royal Field Artillery
Captain Sidney Herbert Wright, Royal Garrison Artillery
Temp. Lieutenant Straun Wright-Smith, Devonshire Regiment
Temp. Captain William Henry York, Royal Engineers

For distinguished service in connection with Military Operations in Egypt —
Lieutenant Ronald James Allan, Scottish Rifles
Act. Subadar Alim-Sher, Hong Kong-Singapore, Royal Garrison Artillery
Captain William Anderson, Highland Light Infantry
Temp. Lieutenant Richard Hynman Andrew, Gen. List
Temp. Captain Reginald Woodward Andrews, Army Service Corps
2nd Lieutenant James Archibald  Imperial Camel Corps Brigade
Captain William Percy Armitage, Dragoon Guards
Captain Robert Douglas Baird, Rifle Brigade
Captain Denis Haughton Bates, Yeomanry
Captain Douglas Wales Berry  Royal Army Medical Corps
2nd Lieutenant William Tulloch Bichan, Royal Scots
Hon. Captain John Moor Brewis, Army Ordnance Depot
Captain Frederick Gerald Bright, Essex Regiment
Lieutenant Arthur Anthony Brown, Royal Field Artillery
Temp. 2nd Lieutenant Edward Hull Burbidge, Army Service Corps
Lieutenant William Wood Burkett, Yeomanry
Lieutenant Edward North Buxton, Royal Horse Artillery
Captain Patrick Maitland Campbell, Yeomanry
Quarter Master and Hon. Lieutenant Algernon James Canvin, Yeomanry
Temp. Lieutenant Augustus Joseph Cherry, Royal Engineers
Temp. Lieutenant Harold Claude Clements, Machine Gun Corps
Captain Norman Coates, Royal Warwickshire Regiment
Temp. Captain Leonard Walter Cox, Army Service Corps
Lieutenant William Henry Pryse Craig, Royal Engineers
Lieutenant Gilbert Howell Davies, Royal Engineers
Lieutenant Joseph Albert de Rosse, Indian Army Reserve of Officers
Temp. Lieutenant Ralph Thomas Edge, Royal Engineers
Lieutenant John Herbert Conrad Faire, Army Service Corps
Lieutenant William Guy Fison, Royal Field Artillery
Captain Walter Wortley Flatt, Norfolk Regiment
Lieutenant Oscar Ernest German, Yeomanry
Temp. Captain Raymond Gwynne Goslett, Army Service Corps
Lieutenant Ivor Garlake Gott, Royal Field Artillery
Lieutenant Bernard Hilliard Frederick Edward Hayden, Royal Welsh Fusiliers, and Machine Gun Corps
Lieutenant John Henderson, Argyll and Sutherland Highlanders
Captain Charles Offley Harvey, Indian Cavalry
Jemadar Hasan Shah, Indian Cavalry
Lieutenant Charles Swainson Heywood, Army Corps of Clerks
Captain Charles Holland, Army Veterinary Corps
Captain Geoffrey Michael Hooper, London Regiment
Lieutenant Stafford Vere Hotchkin, Royal Horse Artillery
Captain Humphrey Francis Humphreys  Royal Army Medical Corps
Captain George Erskine Jackson, Yeomanry
Temp. Captain Ambrose Keevil, Royal Munster Fusiliers
Temp. Lieutenant Alexander Herbert Killick, Machine Gun Corps (Lieutenant, South Lancashire Regiment)
Temp. Lieutenant Marshall Leonard Ireland Kingston, Royal Warwickshire Regiment
Temp. Captain Archibald Henry Robert Montgomery Laird, Army Service Corps
Temp. Lieutenant Thomas Stevenson Lancaster, Royal Engineers
Lieutenant Alfred Noel Law, Northamptonshire Regiment
Captain William Stephenson Lornie, Army Veterinary Corps
Captain William Oliver Luscombe, Rifle Brigade
Temp. 2nd Lieutenant Eustace D. Machray, Spec. List
Lieutenant Robert Weir Macpherson, Royal Engineers
Lieutenant Robert McCash, Yeomanry
Lieutenant William Ewart McGregor, Army Service Corps
Lieutenant Robert William Mitchell, Royal Engineers
Temp. 2nd Lieutenant Hugh Jocelyn Grosvenor Monro, Army Service Corps
Lieutenant Edward Davies Moore, Yeomanry, attd. Machine Gun Corps
Lieutenant John Watcyn Morgan, Royal Engineers
Temp. Lieutenant George William Murray, Gen. List
Captain William Lenox Naper, Royal Horse Guards
Lieutenant Sydney Naylor, Manchester Regiment
Captain Arthur Charles Burnaby Neate, Royal Garrison Artillery
Lieutenant Olive Needell, Essex Regiment, and Machine Gun Corps
Quarter Master and Hon. Lieutenant George William Olden, Gen. List
Lieutenant Howell Owen, Royal Field Artillery
Lieutenant Hugh Lloyd Owen, East Lancashire Regiment, and Machine Gun Corps
Lieutenant Lord Victor William Paget, Royal Horse Guards
Temp. Lieutenant Norman Kingsley Pearce, Royal Engineers
Lieutenant Herbert Perowne, Yeomanry
Captain Cyril Eaton Petley, Royal Army Medical Corps
Lieutenant Arthur Edward Powell, Indian Army Reserve of Officers
Temp. Captain Allan Stephen Quartermaine, Royal Engineers
Temp. Captain Robert Wallace Simpson, Army Veterinary Corps
Captain Percy Sheldon, Cheshire Regiment
Captain Reginald Henry Macaulay Abel Smith, Yeomanry
Captain Percy Cyril Snatt, Liverpool Regiment
Lieutenant Reginald James Stranger, Royal Irish Fusiliers
Temp. Captain William Llewellyn Thomas, British West Indies Regiment
Captain Arthur Malcolm Trustram Eve, Royal Welsh Fusiliers
Lieutenant William Vincent, Army Service Corps
Temp. Captain Hope Brankston Viney, Army Service Corps
Temp. Lieutenant Henry Charles Waghorn, Royal Engineers
Captain Thomas Watters, North Lancashire Regiment
Captain Arnold John Wells, Army Service Corps
Captain Charles Pullar Will, Scottish Rifles and Machine Gun Corps
Temp. Captain Frederick Christian Williams, Army Ordnance Depot
Lieutenant Claud Herbert Williams, Yeomanry, and Machine Gun Corps
Captain John Workman Wintringham, Yeomanry, and Machine Gun Corps

Australian Imperial Force
Lieutenant Holt Hardy, Light Horse Regiment
Lieutenant Stanley Frank Howard, Imperial Camel Corps Brigade
Quarter Master and Hon. Captain John Bede Moylan, Imperial Camel Corps Brigade
Lieutenant Richard Kingsmill Moore, Imperial Camel Corps Brigade
Captain Ernest Boscawen Ranclaud, Imperial Camel Corps Brigade

New Zealand Force
2nd Lieutenant Victor Emiel Adolph, Imperial Camel Corps Brigade

For distinguished services rendered in connection with Military Operations on the Indian Frontier. (Dated 1 January 1918)—
Captain Alexander Sutherland Mackay, Gurkha Rifles, Indian Army
2nd Lieutenant Chandra Bahadur Karki, Nepalese Rifles

For distinguished services rendered in connection with Military Operations in Russia—
2nd Lieutenant John Joseph Hitching, London Regiment
Captain Herbert Evelyn Lee, Gen. List
Temp. 2nd Lieutenant Sir Victor Alexander George Anthony Warrender  Gen. List

For valuable services rendered in connection with Military Operations in Italy —
Temp Captain Francis John Allen  Royal Army Medical Corps
Temp Captain Robert Carr Allinson, Army Veterinary Corps
Captain Llewellyn Augustus Arthur Alston, Royal Welsh Fusiliers
Temp 2nd Lieutenant William Thomas Anderson, Middlesex Regiment, attd. Machine Gun Corps
2nd Lieutenant Alfred Andrews, Royal Garrison Artillery
2nd Lieutenant William Henry Ablin, Royal West Surrey Regiment
Rev. Leonard John William Babb, Army Chaplains' Department
Temp Captain Lawrence Weir Bain  Royal Army Medical Corps
Lieutenant Reginald Herbert Ball, Gloucestershire Regiment
2nd Lieutenant William Barraclough, Dragoons, attd. West Yorkshire Regiment
Temp Captain Cyril Ward Bartlett, Nottinghamshire & Derbyshire Regiment
Lieutenant Frederick George Batty, Yorkshire Regiment
Hon. Lieutenant and Quartermaster William Lack Bayes, Royal Warwickshire Regiment
Lieutenant Francis Cuvelje Bedwell, West Yorkshire Regiment
Captain Hugh Sam Benyon, Yeomanry
Temp Captain Peter Bergheim, Royal Garrison Artillery
Temp Captain Herbert Hillel Berlandina, Royal Engineers
Lieutenant Thomas Hume Bischoff, Royal Field Artillery
Lieutenant Hugh Sudell Bloomer, Manchester Regiment, attd. Royal Warwickshire Regiment
Temp Lieutenant Thomas William Brereton, Royal West Surrey Regiment
2nd Lieutenant Arthur Claude Brewitt, King's Own Scottish Borderers, attd. Machine Gun Corps
Lieutenant Basil Herbert Bright, Worcestershire Regiment
Lieutenant Henry James Casey, Royal Garrison Artillery
Temp Lieutenant Neville Baldwin Chichester, Royal Engineers
2nd Lieutenant Tom Clark, Royal Engineers
Lieutenant Walter George Clements, Royal Artillery
Temp Captain Oswald Coope, Machine Gun Corps
Lieutenant George Alfred Crowther, York and Lancaster Regiment
Lieutenant Francis Rennie Daniel, Royal Field Artillery
Temp Lieutenant Joseph Langley Davis, Northumberland Fusiliers
Temp Surg. Captain Charles Gordon Deane, Br. West India Regiment
Temp Lieutenant John William Dixon, Machine Gun Corps
Temp Lieutenant Donovan Drewery, Durham Light Infantry
Lieutenant Victor Fuller Eberle, Royal Engineers
Lieutenant Harold Eccles, Royal Engineers
Temp 2nd Lieutenant Vincent Edwards, attd. West Riding Regiment
Captain Robinson Elsdale, Royal Engineers
Temp Captain Hubert Sydney Emery, Middlesex Regiment
Captain Morgan Paget Evans, Royal Artillery
Lieutenant Walter Ogilvie Field, Royal Warwickshire Regiment
Rev. Lucas Thomas Thompson Fisher, Army Chaplains' Department
Captain Theodore Vandermere Fleming, Army Service Corps
2nd Lieutenant Arthur Ernest Fox, Royal Garrison Artillery
Rev. Frederick George Freely, Army Chaplains' Department
Lieutenant Alfred James Gamblen, W. India Regiment
2nd Lieutenant James Alexander Garvie, King's Own Scottish Borderers
Captain Alan Keith, Gibson, Oxfordshire & Buckinghamshire Light Infantry 
Sergeant Major Harry King Gibson, King's Royal Rifle Corps, now Machine Gun Corps
Lieutenant John Gordon Leslie Girdlestone, Devonshire Regiment
Quartermaster S. Cecil Glanville, Honourable Artillery Company
Quartermaster and Hon. Lieutenant Ephraim Walter Goulds, Royal West Kent Regiment
Temp Lieutenant Eversley Bernard Green, Devonshire Regiment
Temp Lieutenant George Donald Greenland, Norfolk Regiment
Temp Lieutenant Kenneth Maclver Grierson, Manchester Regiment
Lieutenant Harold Crichton-Stuart Grubb, Royal Irish Fusiliers, attd. Royal Engineers
Captain Thomas John Guest, Royal West Kent Regiment
Temp Captain William Edward Hallinan, Royal Army Medical Corps
Lieutenant Charles Theodore Hudson Harrison, Gloucestershire Regiment
Lieutenant Reginald Frederick Henderson, Spec. List (late Royal Marines)
Lieutenant Herbert MacLaren Henry, Machine Gun Corps
Quartermaster and Hon. Lieutenant Arthur Higham, Royal Fusiliers
Lieutenant Albert Hoare, Royal Garrison Artillery
Temp Lieutenant Simeon Holden, Manchester Regiment
Lieutenant Maurice Joseph Holdsworth, Sussex Regiment
Temp 2nd Lieutenant William Charles Holmes, Royal Fusiliers
Temp Lieutenant Ashby Arthur William Hooper, Royal Artillery
Temp Captain George Wren Howard, King's Royal Rifle Corps
Lieutenant Leslie Hughes, Worcestershire Regiment, attd. Royal Engineers
Sergeant Master William Hutchens, Royal Army Medical Corps
Lieutenant George Brumwell Jameson, Royal Field Artillery
Temp 2nd Lieutenant Samuel Ferguson Johnston. Durham Light Infantry
Lieutenant Henry William Jones, Devonshire Regiment
Quartermaster and Hon. Lieutenant Benjamin William Jordan, Royal West Surrey Regiment
Temp Captain Walter Monckton Keesey, Royal Engineers
Temp Lieutenant Bernard Burrows Kirby, Gloucestershire Regiment
Lieutenant David Gordon Kydd, Royal Scots, attd. Machine Gun Corps
Lieutenant Harry Percival Lane, Royal Field Artillery
2nd Lieutenant Sydney Claud Lam, Royal Berkshire Regiment
Temp Lieutenant Charles Aikin Lawford, attd. South Staffordshire Regiment
Temp Captain Henry Berry Lees, Royal Engineers
Lieutenant Philip Edwin Leybourne, Hampshire Regiment
Temp Lieutenant Walter Kingsbury Lucas, Royal Field Artillery
Temp Captain Eric Alfred Lumley  Royal Army Medical Corps
Lieutenant William Arthur Mackenzie, Royal Field Artillery
Temp Lieutenant James Elliott Furneaux Mann, Yorkshire Light Infantry
Lieutenant Terence Leslie Manson, Royal West Surrey Regiment
Temp Lieutenant John McKenzie Menzies, Royal Artillery
Rev. Bernard McGarvey, Army Chaplains' Department
Temp Lieutenant Arthur Gresham Modlock, Royal Field Artillery
Lieutenant James Bruce Moir, Argyll & Sutherland Highlanders, attd. Machine Gun Corps
Lieutenant Charles Cosmo Monkhouse, Royal Garrison Artillery
Temp Lieutenant Alexander George Moms
Lieutenant Harold Mortimer, Seaforth Highlanders, attd. Royal Warwickshire Regiment
Lieutenant Ralph John Morton, Royal Artillery
Captain Rowland William Nield, Worcestershire Regiment
Lieutenant John Edmund Eckley Oakeley, Herefordshire Regiment, attd. Cheshire Regiment
Company Sergeant Major Edward Oliver, South Staffordshire Regiment
Captain John Wildman Orange-Bromehead, Yorkshire Light Infantry, attd. Royal Engineers
Temp Lieutenant Kenneth Raymond Pelly, Army Service Corps
Lieutenant James Allan Dyson Perrins, Welsh Guards
2nd Lieutenant Sidney Perry  Royal West Surrey Regiment
Temp Captain John Sydney Phillips, South Staffordshire Regiment
2nd Lieutenant Donald Henry Pickard, Middlesex Regiment
Temp Captain Michael Patrick Power, Royal Army Medical Corps
Temp Captain Geoffrey Lee Pyman 
Temp Lieutenant Thomas James Redhead, Manchester Regiment
Temp Captain Harold Digby Rees, Royal Warwickshire Regiment
Temp Quartermaster and Hon. Lieutenant Harry Edward Reimann, King's Royal Rifle Corps
Captain Douglass George Robb, Royal Engineers
2nd Lieutenant Alfred Sidney Roberts, Royal Warwickshire Regiment
Quartermaster Sergeant Percival Laidler Robson, Durham Light Infantry
Temp Lieutenant Harold Roper, Devonshire Regiment
Temp Lieutenant Cecil Thomas Royle, Royal West Surrey Regiment
2nd Lieutenant Douglas Gordon Sharp, West Yorkshire Regiment
Temp Lieutenant Frank Cecil Siddons, Royal Warwickshire Regiment
Lieutenant Frederick Lester Sidebotham, Royal Engineers
Captain Robert William Benjamin Simms, General List
Quartermaster and Hon. Captain Ernest Smith, Norfolk Regiment
Lieutenant George Henry Smith, Worcestershire Regiment
Lieutenant Arland Christopher William Ussher Stanley, Royal Inniskilling Fusiliers, and Machine Gun Corps
Captain Lionel Fenton Stephenson, South Staffordshire Regiment
Captain Ludwig Siebert Benjamin Tasker  Royal Army Medical Corps
2nd Lieutenant Arthur Alexander Taylor, Gloucestershire Regiment
Lieutenant William Frederic Pattern Thomas, South Staffordshire Regiment
2nd Lieutenant Herbert Donald Thompson, South Staffordshire Regiment
Temp Lieutenant Harold Greig Thompson
Company Sergeant Major John Thomson, Argyll & Sutherland Highlanders
Quartermaster and Hon. Captain Robert Thorne, Royal West Kent Regiment
Lieutenant Maurice Charles Prendergast Vereker, Royal Artillery
Lieutenant David Vyle, Royal Field Artillery
Lieutenant Arthur Wales, Essex Regiment, attd. Trench Mortar Battery
Temp Captain Harry Bernard Ward, Royal Engineers
Temp Captain John Waring, Manchester Regiment
Temp Captain Frank William Waydelin, Royal West Kent Regiment
Captain Cyril Hackett Wilkinson, Coldstream Guards
Lieutenant John Willatt, Machine Gun Corps
Lieutenant Thomas Victor Williams, Duke of Cornwall's Light Infantry
Temp 2nd Lieutenant Harold Wilson, Machine Gun Corps
Sergeant Major William John Wilson, Royal Army Medical Corps
Lieutenant Lord John Wodehouse, Lancers
Temp 2nd Lieutenant Henry John Birks Woodfield, Royal Warwickshire Regiment 
Captain George Henry Wright, Leinster Regiment, attd. Machine Gun Corps
Lieutenant John Egbert Young, Royal Garrison Artillery

South African Force
Lieutenant Atholl Murray McGregor, South African Horse Artillery

Awarded a Bar to the Military Cross (MC*)

For services rendered in connection with Military Operations in France and Flanders —
Lieutenant John Archibald  Gordon Highlanders
Captain Hugh Armitage Baker  Royal Horse Artillery
Temp Lieutenant Reginald Edward Bennett  Royal Field Artillery
Temp Captain William Henry Blackburn  Royal Engineers
2nd Lieutenant John Humphrey Blackwell  Bedfordshire Regiment
2nd Lieutenant Frank Bremner Callis  Royal Garrison Artillery
Temp 2nd Lieutenant Bertrand Stanley Carter  Tank Corps
Lieutenant Stephen William Chapman  Royal Engineers
Temp Captain William Cooper  King's Own Yorkshire Light Infantry
Lieutenant Conrad Vaisey Wathen Court  Worcestershire Regiment
Captain James Hardwicke Dyer  Royal Engineers
2nd Lieutenant Arthur Henry Edgell  Machine Gun Corps
Captain Thomas Stokoe Elliot  Royal Army Medical Corps
Captain James John Pugh Evans  Welsh Guards
Lieutenant Arthur Harold Ewing  East Yorkshire Regiment
Lieutenant Donald Finlayson  Yeomanry
Captain William Thomas Gill  Dragoon Guards
Temp Captain Hugh Abbott Green  Royal Inniskilling Fusiliers
2nd Lieutenant William Joshua Griggs  Royal Garrison Artillery
Lieutenant Robert Henry Warren Heard  Irish Guards
Lieutenant Alfred Leslie Herridge  Lancashire Fusiliers, attd. Machine Gun Corps
Temp Lieutenant Robert Carl Hobson  Northumberland Fusiliers
Temp 2nd Lieutenant Alexander Douglas Hume  Royal Sussex Regiment, attd. Royal Fusiliers
Captain Arthur Edmund Ironside  Royal Army Medical Corps
Temp Captain Cuthbert Charles Rydon Jacks  Northumberland Regiment
Lieutenant William Francis Jackson  Royal Engineers, attd. Tank Corps
Temp Captain George William Blomfield James  Royal Army Medical Corps
Temp Lieutenant Reginald Coldham Knight  Tank Corps
Lieutenant Walter James Knight  London Regiment
Captain Hugh Robert Lodge  Royal Field Artillery, attd. Royal Field Artillery
Temp Captain Daniel Eric Logan  Royal Field Artillery
2nd Lieutenant John Leonard Loveridge  Royal Berkshire Regiment seconded Tank Corps
Temp Lieutenant Frederick John Mallett  Royal Engineers
Temp Lieutenant John Ewart March  Royal Engineers
Lieutenant Robert Richard McCartney  Royal Field Artillery
Temp 2nd Lieutenant Christopher Bentley Meadows  Royal Lancaster Regiment
Lieutenant Gerald Grimwood Mears  Royal Garrison Artillery
Temp Captain George Christian Meredith  Cheshire Regiment
Captain Hamilton Stephen Moore  Royal Army Medical Corps
Temp Captain Arthur Forde Nutting  King's Royal Rifle Corps
Lieutenant Alexander Paton  Royal Garrison Artillery
Temp Captain Samuel J. Price  General List
Captain Laurence James Leslie Pullar  Seaforth Highlanders, attd. Machine Gun Corps
Lieutenant John William Hay Robertson  Royal Highlanders
Captain Hugh Huntley Robinson  Royal Army Medical Corps
Captain John Rowe  Royal Army Medical Corps
Captain Philip Russell  Royal Field Artillery
Temp 2nd Lieutenant Alfred John. Shipton  Royal Berkshire Regiment
Temp Lieutenant John Bertie Smeltzer  Machine Gun Corps
Lieutenant George Stevens  Royal Garrison Artillery
Lieutenant Norman Thomas Thurston  London Regiment
Temp Lieutenant Stewart Power Trench  Royal Field Artillery
Lieutenant Harold Runciman Turner  Royal Garrison Artillery
Quartermaster and Hon. Captain Stephen Watson  Royal Highlanders
Captain Ronald Eliot Wilson  Yorkshire and Lancaster Regiment

Canadian Force
Captain Alexander Watson Baird  Central Ontario Regiment

Australian Imperial Force
Captain Francis Edward Fairweather  Infantry
Lieutenant James Henry Julin  Infantry

Distinguished Flying Cross (DFC)
Lieutenant William Hopton Anderson (Australian Flying Corps)
Lieutenant David Claud Bauer
Lieutenant Claver Victor Bessett
Lieutenant Robert Alexander Birkbeck
Lieutenant John Geoffrey Sadler Candy
Lieutenant Bernard Purvis-Broackes Carter
Lieutenant Douglas Colyer
Captain Robert John Orton Compston 
Lieutenant Maurice Lea Cooper
Major Jack Armand Cunningham
Captain Roydon Englefield Ashford Dash
Lieutenant John Charles Oswald Dickson
Lieutenant Thomas Howell French
Lieutenant George Cecil Gardener
Lieutenant Harold Harrison Gonyou
Lieutenant John Edmund Greene
Lieutenant Frederick George Darby Hards 
Lieutenant Francis Herbert Ronald Henwood
Lieutenant Gordon Frank Hyams
Captain Allen Murray Jones  (Australian Flying Corps)
Lieutenant Ernest James-Jones (Australian Flying Corps)
Lieutenant Harold Aidan Laycock
Lieutenant George Chisholme Mackay
Lieutenant William Man
Lieutenant John Stanley Fleming Morrison
Lieutenant Philip John Nolan
Lieutenant Thomas Cooper Pattinson
Lieutenant Arthur Henry Pearce
Lieutenant Edward Robert Pennell
Lieutenant Samuel Richard Penrose-Welsted
Lieutenant Cecil Lodge Philcox
Lieu tenant John William Pinder
Captain John Robinson
Lieutenant Charles Basil Slater Spackman
Captain David Edmund Stodart
Lieutenant Denys Lane Paschel Stuart Stuart-Shepherd
Lieutenant Leonard Thomas Eaton Taplin (Australian Flying Corps)
Captain Awdry Morris Vaucour 
Lieutenant Stephen Wynne Vickers 
Lieutenant William Young Walls
Lieutenant Bert Sterling 
Temp Lieutenant Laurence Arthur Wingfield
Lieutenant Basil Raymond Worthington
Lieutenant George Frederick 
William Zimmer

Distinguished Flying Medal (DFM)

Acting Air Mechanic Albert Edward Clark (Woodford)
Sergeant John Charles Hagan (Ulverston)

Air Force Cross

Lieutenant Valentine Henry Baker 
Captain Robert Benedict Bourdillon 
Major-General William Sefton Brancker
Major Charles Dempster Breese
Lieutenant Henry Duncan Davis
Lieutenant Robert William Dobbie
Lieutenant Llewellyan Lewis Meredith Evans
Major The Honourable William Francis Forbes-Sempill, Master of Sempill
Captain Percy Edward Lovell Gethin
Lieutenant-Colonel Robert Marsland Groves 
Lieutenant Thomas Hayes
Lieutenant Albert Goodeff Henshaw
Captain Bennett Melville Jones
Lieutenant Walter Hunt Longton
Lieutenant Archibald Charles Lutyens 
Lieutenant Laurence Newton Mitchell
Lieutenant John Oliver
Captain Humphrey Rivaz Raikes
Major Robert Raymond Smith-Barry
Lieutenant Charles Gordon Sturt
Lieutenant Terence Bernard Tully

Air Force Medal

Sergeant Samuel James Mitchell (Handsworth, Birmingham)
Sergeant Frederick Charles Tucker (Birtley, Durham)

Kaisar-i-Hind Medal
First Class
Reverend Herbert Anderson, Secretary, Calcutta Temperance Federation and Indian Secretary, Baptist Missionary Society, and Member, Licensing Board, Bengal
Robert Alexander Boswell Chapman, Indian Civil Service, Deputy Commissioner, Yeotmal, Berar, Central Provinces
Henry Newton Crouch, Additional Judicial Commissioner, Sind, Bombay
Seth Jai Dayal, of Mohiuddinpur, Sitapur, United Provinces
Reverend Elias William Kelly  Missionary, Superintendent, Judson Boys High School, Moulmein, Burma
Reverend Canon Cecil Stansfeld Rivington, Bombay
Reverend Father Louis Van Hoeck,  Rector, Roman Catholic Mission, Ranchi, Bihar and Orissa
Sister Mary Victoria, Clewer Sisters of St John the Baptist, Principal, Diocesan College for Indian Girls at Ballygunge, Calcutta
Margaret Vernon.

Imperial Service Order (ISO)
Home Civil Service
George Boyd, First Assistant Registrar of Deeds, Ireland
William Brown, Assistant Controller of Stamps, Stocks Exchange and Lloyd's
John Crombie, Sub-Inspector of Schools, Scotland
Alfred Robert Dryhurst, Assistant Secretary, British Museum
Edwin Gilbert, Accountant, Charity Commission
Frederick William Barnard Godrich, Principal Clerk, Public Works Loan Board
Haywood Temple Holmes  Accountant, Treasury
Robert George Lundy, Cashier, War Office
Charles Herbert Niblett, Librarian, Colonial Office
John Thomas Samuel, Deputy Chief Inspector, Customs and Excise
George William Sellar, Superintending Clerk, Standards Department
John Wilkinson Shergold, Postmaster Surveyor of Birmingham
William John Henderson Sinclair  Medical Officer, Barlinnie Prison
William Goodyear Wightman, Assistant Controller, H.M. Stationery Office

Colonial Civil Service
Philip Lawton Hinds Archer, Controller of Customs of the Gold Coast Colony
Francis Kent Bennetts, Assistant Clerk of the King's Privy Council for Canada
Alfred Earle Burt, late Registrar of Titles and Deeds, State of Western Australia
Harry Walton Collymore, Chief Clerk, Colonial Secretary's Office, Island of Barbados
John Edward de Silva Surya Bandara, lately Commissioner of Requests and Police Magistrate, Kalutara, Island of Ceylon
Robert West Holmes  Engineer-in Chief, Public Works Department, Dominion of New Zealand
Ernest Frederick Jarvis, Assistant Deputy Minister, Department of Militia and Defence, Dominion of Canada
Thomas Augustus Thompson, Registrar of the Supreme Court, Colony of Trinidad and Tobago
Percy Whitton, Collector of Customs, Victoria; Department of Trade and Customs, Commonwealth of Australia

Indian Civil Service
John Richardson Atkinson, Attorney-at-Law, Deputy Registrar, High Court of Judicature, Madras
Henry George Street Brooks, Assistant to the Superintendent of the Indian Store Depot, Senior Assistant Surgeon and Honorary Major Michael Courtney, Indian Subordinate Medical Department, Superintendent, Central Jail, Montgomery, Punjab.
Raj Ganga Charan Chatterjee, Bahadur, Magistrate and Collector, Pabna, Bengal
Maung Me  Headquarters Assistant to Deputy Commissioner, Tharrawaddy, Extra Assistant Commissioner, 4th Grade, Burma.
George Herbert Cockman, Military Accounts Department
Raj Bahadur Gyanendra Nath Chakravarti  Inspector of Schools, Benares, United Provinces
Raj Abinas Chandra Khan Bahadur, Senior Superintendent in the Home Department of the Government of India
Reginald Medlycott, Registrar, Office of the Inspector General of Police, Bengal
Antony Marcel Peris, Registrar, Office of the Resident in Mysore, Mysore Residency
Gerald Eyre Wilson, late Registrar, Office of the Private Secretary to His Excellency the Viceroy

Royal Red Cross (RRC) 

First Class
Margaret Emma Goodall-Copestake, Superintending Sister, Queen Alexandra's Royal Naval Nursing Service
Muriel G. Hutton, Nursing Sister, Queen Alexandra's Royal Naval Nursing Service, Reserve

In recognition of valuable services with the Armies in France and Flanders —

Alberta Beatrice Armstrong, Canadian Army Medical Corps Sister.
Mary Bishop, Acting Sister, Queen Alexandra's Imperial Military Nursing Service
Marion Jane Branson, Sister, Queen Alexandra's Imperial Military Nursing Service
Jessie Maud Cardozo, Sister-in-Charge, Territorial Force Nursing Service
Sarah Jane Cockrell, Matron, Territorial Force Nursing Service
Bessie Hooper Daniels, Acting Sister, Civilian Hospital Reserve
Isabel Georgina Eveleigh, Sister, Territorial Force Nursing Service
Margaret Isobel Gordon, Acting Sister, Civilian Hospital Reserve
Katherine Macfadyen Hager, Matron, American Nursing Service, Harvard Unit
Una Russell Lee, Sister-in-Charge, Queen Alexandra's Imperial Military Nursing Service (R.)
Kate Maxey, Sister-in-Charge, Territorial Force Nursing Service
Alice Edith Milburn, Sister, Territorial Force Nursing Service
Margaret Morton, Matron, British Royal Red Cross
Margaret Anne Newbould, Asst. Matron, Territorial Force Nursing Service
Lillian Pidgeon, Sister, Canadian Army Medical Corps
Bessie Rankin, Sister, Queen Alexandra's Imperial Military Nursing Service (retd.)
Kathleen Shaw, Sister, Canadian Army Medical Corps
Olive Florence Stinton, Sister, Queen Alexandra's Imperial Military Nursing Service
Jeannie Cook Strachan, Acting Sister, Queen Alexandra's Imperial Military Nursing Service (R.)
Cecily Varena Elma Thompson  Sister, Queen Alexandra's Imperial Military Nursing Service
Katherine Corstorphine Todd, Sister, Territorial Force Nursing Service
Madeleine Hamilton Watts, Sister, Territorial Force Nursing Service
Anna Weatherstone, Acting Sister, Civilian Hospital Reserve
Margaret Mary Denison Weir, Asst. Matron, Territorial Force Nursing Service
Gwendoline Williams, Acting Sister-in-Charge, Queen Alexandra's Imperial Military Nursing Service (R.)

In recognition of valuable services with the British Forces in Salonika—
Marion Shaw Andrew, Sister-in-Charge, Territorial Force Nursing Service
Constance Eliza Baigent, Act. Sister. Queen Alexandra's Imperial Military Nursing Service (Reserve)
Elizabeth Baillie, Sister, Queen Alexandra's Imperial Military Nursing Service (Reserve)
Winifred Blanchard, Asst. Matron, Queen Alexandra's Imperial Military Nursing Service (Reserve)
Ethel Kate Buchanan, Sister-in-Charge, Territorial Force Nursing Service
Beryl Anderson Campbell, Matron, Australian Army Nursing Service
Cecilia Evans, Staff Nurse, Queen Alexandra's Imperial Military Nursing Service (Reserve)
Jessie Spittall  Sister, Territorial Force Nursing Service
Mildred Lucy Wells, Sister, Queen Alexandra's Imperial Military Nursing Service (Reserve)
In recognition of valuable services with the British Forces in Egypt —
Florence Mary Dodery, Sister, Queen Alexandra's Imperial Military Nursing Service (Reserve)

Second Class
Alice Marion England, Staff Nurse, Royal Navy Hospital, Mount Stuart, Isle of Bute
Ellen Kate Finnemore, Matron, Queen Mary's Royal Navy Hospital, Southend
Isabella Frame Lang, Theatre Sister, Royal Navy Hospital, Mount Stuart, Isle of Bute
Sarah Edith McClelland, Nursing Sister, Queen Alexandra's Royal Naval Nursing Service
Elsie Christian Philp, Matron, Northern Infirmary, Inverness
Elizabeth Ritchie, Matron, Auxiliary Naval Hospital, Grangetown, Yorkshire
Vera L. Spark, Nursing Sister, Queen Alexandra's Royal Naval Nursing Service, Reserve
Zoe E. Strange, Nursing Sister, Queen Alexandra's Royal Naval Nursing Service, Reserve
Margaret Christine Tod, Matron and Masseuse, Royal Navy Auxiliary Hospital, Corstorphine, Edinburgh

In recognition of valuable services with the Armies in France and Flanders —
Lydia Abell, Staff Nurse, Queen Alexandra's Imperial Military Nursing Service (R.)
Edna Mabel Augier, Sister, Canadian Army Medical Corps
Violet Barugh, Sister, Territorial Force Nursing Service
Marion Sabina Bar-well, Sister-in-Charge, Queen Alexandra's Imperial Military Nursing Service (R.)
Muriel Adelaide Batey, British Royal Red Cross, Voluntary Aid Detachment
Edith Francis Beedie, Acting Sister, Queen Alexandra's Imperial Military Nursing Service (R.)
Charlotte Mary Bindloss, Sister, Territorial Force Nursing Service
Katherine Bishop, Voluntary Aid Detachment
Mary Forster Bliss, Sister, Canadian Army Medical Corps
Mildred Natalie Bowden-Smith, Voluntary Aid Detachment
May Ethel Boyd, Voluntary Aid Detachment
Irene Constance Brady, Sister, Canadian Army Medical Corps
May Bragg, Acting Sister, Queen Alexandra's Imperial Military Nursing Service (R.)
Ellen Elizabeth Branson, Acting Sister, Civilian Hospital Reserve
Amy May Browett, Acting Sister, Queen Alexandra's Imperial Military Nursing Service (R.)
Frances Louise Brown, Charge Sister, British Royal Red Cross
Mary Rose Bunting, Sister, Territorial Force Nursing Service
Annie Irvine Buyers, Sister, Queen Alexandra's Imperial Military Nursing Service
Gertrude Walters Carlin, Sister, Territorial Force Nursing Service
Elsie Violet Cassidy, Acting Sister, Civilian Hospital Reserve
Susan Clarke, Acting Sister, Queen Alexandra's Imperial Military Nursing Service (R.)
Sarah Clements, Voluntary Aid Detachment
Ruby Cockburn, Charge Sister, British Royal Red Cross
Mary Cockshott, Sister, Territorial Force Nursing Service
Blanche Cresswick, Sister, Australian Army Nursing Service
Isobel Davies, Sister, Canadian Army Medical Corps
Mary Ellen Davis, Sister, Queen Alexandra's Imperial Military Nursing Service
Sarah Melanie De Mestre, Sister, Australian Army Nursing Service
Irene May Denson, Staff Nurse, Queen Alexandra's Imperial Military Nursing Service (R.)
Bessie Mitchell Dickson, Acting Sister, Civilian Hospital Reserve
Constance Amy Ebden, Nursing Sister, South African Medical NursingService 
Agnes McCheyne Edgar, Acting Sister, Civilian Hospital Reserve
Mildred Edwards, Sister, Territorial Force Nursing Service
Nettie Eisenhard, Nurse, U.S.A. Nursing Corps
Ellen Maude Emberson, Sister, Territorial Force Nursing Service
Hulda Inglejard Enebuske, Sister, American Nursing Service
Annie Wood Falconer, Acting Sister, Queen Alexandra's Imperial Military Nursing Service (R.)
Helen Graham Findlay Fisher, Acting Sister, Civilian Hospital Reserve
Evelyn Ruth Garnett, Voluntary Aid Detachment
Elizabeth Geoghegan, Sister, Australian Army Nursing Service
Ann Isabella Gibb, Acting Sister, Queen Alexandra's Imperial Military Nursing Service (R.)
Ida Mary Grant, British Royal Red Cross
Annice Gray, Acting Sister, Queen Alexandra's Imperial Military Nursing Service (R.)
Lily Naomi Gray, Sister, Canadian Army Medical Corps
Margaret Hannah Griffiths, Acting Sister, Queen Alexandra's Imperial Military Nursing Service (R.)
Christina MacKay Gunn, Staff Nurse, Queen Alexandra's Imperial Military Nursing Service (R.)
Ursula Alice Hall, Voluntary Aid Detachment
Louisa. Hanson, Acting Sister, Civilian Hospital Reserve
Florence Mary Harper, Voluntary Aid Detachment
Mary Alice Hayes, Theatre Sister, British Royal Red Cross
Theresa Mary Hayes, Sister, Territorial Force Nursing Service
Mabel Vesper Heard, Sister, Territorial Force Nursing Service
Maud Littleton Heathcote, Voluntary Aid Detachment
Clara Henderson, British Royal Red Cross
Elizabeth Irwin Henry, Voluntary Aid Detachment
Helen Joy Hinckley, Sister, American Nursing Serv
Rosina Mabel Hook, Sister-in-Charge, Queen Alexandra's Imperial Military Nursing Service (R.)
Isabella Rutherford Inglis, Acting Sister, Queen Alexandra's Imperial Military Nursing Service (R.)
Lilian Mary Jenkins, Acting Sister, Civilian Hospital Reserve
May Gwendoline Keen, Sister-in-Charge, Territorial Force Nursing Service
Alice Ross King, Sister, Australian Army Nursing Service
Annie Vanette Robertson Kydd, Voluntary Aid Detachment
Fanny Law, Charge Sister, British Royal Red Cross
Violet Law, Acting Sister, Queen Alexandra's Imperial Military Nursing Service (R.)
Marion Leppard, Acting Sister, Civilian Hospital Reserve
Elizabeth Georgina Lowe, Sister-in-Charge, Queen Alexandra's Imperial Military Nursing Service
Marie Dow Lutwick, Acting Sister, Queen Alexandra's Imperial Military Nursing Service (R.)
Mary Lyster, Voluntary Aid Detachment
Beatrice Macdonald, Nurse, U.S.A. Nursing Corps
Henrietta Mackay, Acting Sister, Civilian Hospital Reserve
Edith Duncan Mackenzie, Acting Sister, Queen Alexandra's Imperial Military Nursing Service (R.)
Katherine Mackenzie, Acting Sister, Civilian Hospital Reserve
Margaret Cameron MacLean, Sister, Territorial Force Nursing Service
Christina Macrae, Sister (Asst. Matron), Queen Alexandra's Imperial Military Nursing Service
Lois Marsden, Asst. Matron, British Royal Red Cross
Theodora Marsh, Voluntary Aid Detachment
Hilda Martin, Voluntary Aid Detachment
Emma Osborne Masters, Voluntary Aid Detachment
Sadie Charlotte. McDonald, Sister, Australian Army Nursing Service
Harriet Miller, Acting Sister-in-Charge, Queen Alexandra's Imperial Military Nursing Service (R.)
Gertrude Edith Mirrington, Voluntary Aid Detachment
Nellie Constance Morrice, Head Sister, Australian Army Nursing Service
Ruth Eleanore Nicholas, British Royal Red Cross
Mabel Noyes, Sister, American Nursing Serv
Beatrice Muriel Nye, Sister (Asst. Matron), Queen Alexandra's Imperial Military Nursing Service
Jane Jessie Arthur Paul, Acting Sister, Queen Alexandra's Imperial Military Nursing Service (R.)
Elsie Clare Pidgeon, Sister, Australian Army Nursing Service
Catherine Elizabeth Pierce, Nursing Sister, Canadian Army Medical Corps
Florence Pierrepont, Sister, Territorial Force Nursing Service
Florence Clarita Piza, Charge Sister, British Royal Red Cross
Majorie Platt, Voluntary Aid Detachment
Ethel Mary Poole, Acting Sister, Queen Alexandra's Imperial Military Nursing Service (R.)
Lily Maud Privett, Voluntary Aid Detachment
Bessie Duncan Blyth Reid, Acting Sister, Civilian Hospital Reserve (Edinburgh R. Infirmary)
Frances Augusta Rice, Sister, Canadian Army Medical Corps
Margaret Richardson, Voluntary Aid Detachment
Charlotte Lilian Anne Robinson, Acting Sister, Queen Alexandra's Imperial Military Nursing Service
Mary Jane Roche, Nurse, U.S.A. Nursing Corps
Molly Ruddock, Charge Sister, British Royal Red Cross
Susan Eva Sanctuary, Voluntary Aid Detachment
Margaret Wilson Savage, Sister, Territorial Force Nursing Service
Ino Skinner, Staff Nurse, Queen Alexandra's Imperial Military Nursing Service (R.)
Wilhelmina Soiling, Acting Sister, Queen Alexandra's Imperial Military Nursing Service (R.)
Gwendolin Spalding, Sister, Canadian Army Medical Corps
Frances Ann Spedding, Acting Sister, Civilian Hospital Reserve
Evelyn Zaida Stubington, British Royal Red Cross
Barbara Sythes, Acting Sister, Civilian Hospital Reserve
Edith Gertrude Taylor, Voluntary Aid Detachment
Katharine Rosa Tompson, Voluntary Aid Detachment
Hester Trimble, British Royal Red Cross, Voluntary Aid Detachment
Jane Elizabeth Trotter, Acting Sister, Queen Alexandra's Imperial Military Nursing Service (R.)
Dorothy Frances Webb, Staff Nurse, Australian Army Nursing Service
Mary Evelyn Wedderspoon, Acting Sister, Queen Alexandra's Imperial Military Nursing Service (R.)
Martha Whent, Matron, British Royal Red Cross
Florence Elizabeth Widdop, Sister, Territorial Force Nursing Service
Alice Mary Willcox, Charge Sister, British Royal Red Cross
Mabel Alice Williams Acting Sister, Civilian Hospital Reserve
Marjorie Williams, Voluntary Aid Detachment
Nellie Williamson, Voluntary Aid Detachment
Eliza Workman, Nursing Sister, British Royal Red Cross
Eleanor Wyles, Asst. Matron, British Royal Red Cross
Sarah Edith Young, Sister, Canadian Army Medical Corps
Charlotte Younghusband, Sister, Canadian Army Medical Corps

In recognition of valuable services with the British Forces in Salonika—
Alice Mary Fletcher, Sister, Queen Alexandra's Imperial Military Nursing Service (Reserve)
Frances Muriel Hobbs, Sister, Queen Alexandra's Imperial Military Nursing Service (Reserve)
Kathryn Mary Jordan, Sister, Queen Alexandra's Imperial Military Nursing Service (Reserve)
Wilhelmina Lee, Staff Nurse, Queen Alexandra's Imperial Military Nursing Service (Reserve)
Euphemia Scott Loraine, Staff Nurse, Queen Alexandra's Imperial Military Nursing Service (Reserve)
Elizabeth Clark Neil, Sister, Territorial Force Nursing Service
Florence Runton, Staff Nurse, Queen Alexandra's Imperial Military Nursing Service (Reserve)
Christense Sorenson, Sister, Australian Army Nursing Service
Marjory Stephenson, Superintendent (Prin. Commandant), Voluntary Aid Detachment
Hannah. Elizabeth Stubbs, Staff Nurse, Territorial Force Nursing Service
Maud Jane Todman, Sister, Queen Alexandra's Imperial Military Nursing Service (Reserve)
Lizzie Varley, Sister, Queen Alexandra's Imperial Military Nursing Service (Reserve)

In recognition of valuable services with the British Forces in Egypt —
Winifred Alice Attenborough, Act. Matron, Territorial Force Nursing Service
Miss Elizabeth Mabel Bickerdike, Asst. Matron, Queen Alexandra's Imperial Military Nursing Service (Retired)
Violett Annie Rutter, Asst. Matron, Territorial Force Nursing Service
Marianne Liddell Slater, Asst. Matron, Queen Alexandra's Imperial Military Nursing Service (Reserve)

For valuable services rendered in connection with Military Operations in Italy —
Isabelle Mary Baron, Nurse, Spec. Mil. Prob
Elizabeth Bartholomew, Voluntary Aid Detachment
Margaret. Russell Casswell, Matron, Queen Alexandra's Imperial Military Nursing Service
Margaret Gale, Nurse, Voluntary Aid Detachment
Margaret Edith Lyra Jameson, Voluntary Aid Detachment
Mary Adelaide Christabel Robinson, Voluntary Aid Detachment Prob. S.J.A.B

Awarded a Bar to the Royal Red Cross
In recognition of valuable services with the Armies in France and Flanders —
Kate Evelyn Luard  Sister-in-Charge, Queen Alexandra's Imperial Military Nursing Service (R.)

In recognition of valuable services with the British Forces on the Mediterranean Line of Communications—
Elizabeth Ann Dowse  Matron, Queen Alexandra's Imperial Military Nursing Service

Distinguished Conduct Medal (DCM) 

For distinguished services in connection with Military Operations with the British Forces in Egypt —
Gunner J. Allan, Royal Garrison Artillery (Millport)
Lance Captain J. Aylott, Royal Engineers (St. Albans)
Sergeant Clement Victor Biddlecombe, Royal Engineers (Catford, S.E.)
Sergeant J. H. Bromhead, Yeomanry (Clifton)
Private F. Bryan, Army Veterinary Corps (Peplow)
Sergeant J. E. Burbeck, Royal Engineers (Aberystwyth)
Captain W. Byard, Leinster Regiment (Enfield)
Corporal A. B. Chalkin, Royal Engineers (Tonbridge)
Sergeant J. Clark, Honourable Artillery Company (Wanstead Park, N.E.)
Gunner H. Crowther, Motor Machine Gun Corps (Dewsbury)
Captain H. Crowther, Royal Engineers (Leeds)
Private J. L. Evans, Shropshire Light Infantry (Minsterley)
Lance Captain E. Fowler, Royal Engineers (Chard)
Sergeant W. H. Grover, Royal Garrison Artillery (N. Ormsby)
Lance Captain D. Harvey, Royal Engineers (Gillingham)
Private J. Hope, British West Indies Regiment (Barbados)
Captain Leonard Thomas Leybourne, Royal Army Medical Corps (Cambridge)
Sergeant Major G. F. Lyon, Royal Army Medical Corps (Norwich)
Staff Sergeant J. McKay, Royal Army Medical Corps (Aberdeen)
Act. Captain F. Meade, Machine Gun Corps (Drogheda)
Private R. H. Parry, Shropshire Light Infantry (Shrewsbury)
H.K.S.B. Havildar Rur Singh, Hong Kong, Singapore Royal Garrison Artillery
2nd Captain A. E. Rogers, Royal Engineers (Bristol)
Farrier Quarter Master S. P. Timmons, Royal Field Artillery (Dundee)
Fttr. J. Walsh, Royal Field Artillery (Blackburn)
Sergeant J. Wrench, North Lancashire Regiment (Bolton)
Sergeant A. E. B. Younghusband, Yeomanry (Putney)

Australian Imperial Force
Private P. H. Caine, Infantry
Sergeant W. Cruickshank, Light Horse Regiment
Sergeant F. G. H. Garrett, Light Horse Regiment
Captain E. Holland, Engineers
Squadron Sergeant Major K. Lawlor, Light Horse Regiment
2nd Captain R. McD. Leslie, Engineers
Sergeant C. Robinson, Imperial Camel Corps Brigade
Sergeant H. Welshman, Engineers
Sergeant W. M. Wilkin, Imperial Camel Corps Brigade

New Zealand Force
Sergeant L. D. Purves, Imperial Camel Corps Brigade

For distinguished service in connection with Military Operations with the Armies in France and Flanders —

2nd Corporal W. H. Adams, Royal Engineers (Yeovil)
Private H. Ainsworth, Lancaster Regiment (Bolton)
Sergeant C E. Alderson, Royal Engineers (Buxton)
Sergeant F. Allen, Cheshire Regiment (Birmingham)
Temp Sergeant Major H. Anderson, Army Cyclist Corps (Yarmouth)
Gunner J Anderson, Royal Garrison Artillery (Walsall)
Sergeant S. Andrews, Scottish Rifles (Dalkeith)
Sergeant E. Ankers, Royal Engineers (Crewe)
Sergeant Major W. Archer, King's Royal Rifle Corps (Letchworth)
Sergeant Major G. T. Arlett, Oxfordshire & Buckinghamshire Light Infantry (Henley-on-Thames)
Sergeant T. Armstrong, Army Service Corps (Upton Park, E.)
Brigadier P. G. Arthur, Royal Garrison Artillery (Builth Wells)
Private E. Ashley, Manchester Regiment (Blackburn)
Sergeant W. Atkinson, Army Service Corps (Leeds)
Sergeant J. W. Attridge, Royal Field Artillery (Battersea, S.W.)
Sergeant Major P. H. Avey, London Regiment (Leytonstone)
Acting Corporal E. Baillie, Royal Scots (Bonnyrigg)
Sergeant C. J. W. Balderston, Royal Engineers (Leyton)
Lance Corporal G. E. Balfe, Royal Engineers (Forest Hill, S.E.)
Temp Sergeant Major J. Banner, Royal Field Artillery (Bolton)
Fitter Staff Sergeant W. M. Bare, Royal Garrison Artillery (Swanscombe)
Corporal A. E. Barker, Royal Engineers (Abingdon)
Regimental Quartermaster Sergeant W. Barker, Nottinghamshire & Derbyshire Regiment (Bakewell)
Gunner C. E. Barnes, Royal Field Artillery (S. Lambeth)
Company Sergeant Major A. H. Barrell, London Regiment (Walthamstow)
Company Sergeant Major J. P. Batey, Royal Engineers (Stockport)
Sergeant Major H. Bealey, Royal Field Artillery (Weston-super-Mare)
Lance Sergeant J. Beard, King's Own Shropshire Light Infantry (Oakengates)
Sergeant J. Beattie  Monmouthshire Regiment (Newcort)
Sergeant F. Beaumont, Royal Field Artillery (Halifax)
Corporal D. Beith, Royal Engineers (Paisley)
Company Sergeant Major A. Bennett, Grenadier Guards (Birmingham)
Sergeant W. J. Bennett, Liverpool Regiment (Liverpool)
Sergeant W. Berry, Royal Field Artillery (City Road, London)
Quartermaster Sergeant H. E. Bevans, Royal Army Medical Corps (St. Johns, S.E.)
Sergeant E. Bibby, Royal Lancaster Regiment (Windermere)
Corporal E. A. W. Bignell, Royal Engineers (Bulford)
Corporal A. Birch, Royal Fusiliers (Longsight, Oldham)
Regimental Quartermaster Sergeant J. Bird, Dragoon Guards (Hounslow)
Sergeant J. S. Birkett, Yorkshire Regiment (Aylesbury)
Private. C. G. Bishop, Royal Fusiliers (Islington)
Lance Corporal C. Blackmore, Royal Engineers (Brixton, S.W.)
Sergeant Major A. E. Bliss, Royal Field Artillery (U. Clapton)
Sergeant Major C. A. Bliss, Royal Field Artillery (Southfields)
Sergeant W. S. Boswell, Royal Engineers (Llanelly)
Sergeant A. Boufler, Royal Garrison Artillery (Woolwich)
Sergeant Major A. Boulter, Royal Field Artillery (Maidenhead)
Private E. C. Bowkett, Royal Army Medical Corps (Manchester)
Brigadier F. Bowling, Royal Garrison Artillery (Stockport)
Gunner C. H. Bradbeer, Royal Field Artillery (Merton, S.W.)
Sergeant G. G. Bradbury, Lancashire Fusiliers (Oldham)
Sergeant Major H. A. Braddick, Royal Field Artillery (St. John's Wood)
Corporal J. Bramwell, Royal Engineers (Bolton)
Temp. Regimental Sergeant Major H. Brand, Cheshire Regiment (Glossop)
Sergeant J. Brazier, Royal Field Artillery (Pimlico. S.W.)
Corporal C. A. Brearley, Royal Engineers (Halifax)
Sergeant J. C. Breeden, Royal Field Artillery (E. Leyton)
Company Sergeant Major H. Breeze  Royal Engineers (Helsby)
Sergeant E. A, Brewer, Army Service Corps (Richmond, Surrey)
Sergeant II. C. Bridge, Royal Field Artillery (Bristol)
Sergeant W. J. Bridges, Royal Garrison Artillery (Homerton, N.E.)
Private J. Brierley, Lancashire Fusiliers (Swinton)
Sergeant Major W. T. Brierley, Royal Field Artillery (Plum-stead)
Sergeant A. G. Briggs, Royal Field Artillery (Canning Town)
Gunner H. Briggs, Royal Garrison Artillery (Leeds)
Corporal A. E. Bright  Coldstream Guards (Birmingham)
Private H. Brindle, Royal Fusiliers (Coventry)
Gunner (Lance Brigadier) E. Britton, Royal Field Artillery (Manchester)
Private J. Broadfoot, Cameron Highlanders (Glasgow)
Private J. B. Bromley, King's Own Shropshire Light Infantry (Pulverbatch)
2nd Corporal J. T. Bromley, Royal Engineers (Chiswick)
Gunner E. Brook, Royal Field Artillery (Huddersfield)
Corporal A. T. Brooks, Royal Engineers (Barry)
Company Sergeant Major J. H. Broom, Corps (Gray's Inn Rd., London)
Lance Brigadier D. Brown, Royal Field Artillery (Sunderland)
Staff Sergeant J. Brown, Royal Army Medical Corps (Aberdeen)
Sergeant J. J. Brown, West Riding Regiment (Skipton)
Acting Quartermaster Sergeant A. Brownson, Cameron Highlanders (Inverness)
Corporal G. S. Buckingham, Royal Engineers (Bristol)
Company Sergeant Major T. Burbidge, Norfolk Regiment (Sydenham)
Gunner P. Burke, Royal Garrison Artillery (Drinagh, Co. Cork)
Temp Sergeant Major F. Burton, Northumberland Fusiliers (Newburn)
Corporal J. R. Butts, Northamptonshire Regiment (Rushden)
Sergeant S. Buxton, Royal Garrison Artillery (St. Helens, Isle of Wight)
Company Sergeant Major A. C. Byfield, Middlesex Regiment (Edmonton)
Lance Corporal J. W. Cameron, Royal Engineers (Leith)
Corporal A. Camp  Royal Field Artillery (Brighton)
Sergeant J. Campbell, Machine Gun Corps (Frant)
Corporal J. Carney, Royal Field Artillery (Pontefract)
Lance Brigadier A. A. Carr, Royal Garrison Artillery (Battersea)
Acting Regimental Sergeant Major C. Carr, Machine Gun Corps (Fulham)
Lance Corporal B. Carter, Liverpool Regiment (Liverpool)
Sergeant H. M. Cartwright, King's Own Scottish Borderers (Darlington)
Private. J. P. Cassels, Army Service Corps (Parsley)
Corporal J. Cassidy, Machine Gun Corps (Manchester)
Private R. Casson, Border Regiment (Carlisle)
Sergeant D. Charleson, Royal Army Medical Corps (Leith)
Company Sergeant Major P. Chase, Lancashire Fusiliers (Hulme)
Corporal W. Chilton, Worcestershire Regiment (Walsall)
Sergeant A. J. Churchill, Royal Garrison Artillery (Salisbury)
Company Sergeant Major W. Clarke, Royal Irish Rifles (Belfast)
Sergeant W. Clarke, Middlesex Regiment (Tottenham)
2nd Corporal G. H. Clarkson, Royal Engineers (Barnsley)
Sergeant W. Clouch, South Lancashire Regiment (Willieton)
Sergeant Major P. Clune, Royal Garrison Artillery (Kilrush)
Sergeant Major W. Cockrain, Essex Regiment (Nottingham)
Private F. E. Cocks, London Regiment (Hendon)
Company Sergeant Major G. Cocks, Lancashire Fusiliers (Hull)
Company Quartermaster Sergeant L. H. Colbran, Army Service Corps (Cambridge)
Temp. Sergeant Major W. D. Coldridge, Lancers (York)
Temp Sergeant Major H. A. Coles, Royal Sussex Regiment (Cocking)
Sapper C. B. Collier, Royal Engineers (Cowley)
Lance Corporal H. A. Collison, Military Foot Police (Middlesbrough)
Acting Sergeant J. Connery, Royal Irish Regiment (Kilmallock)
Sergeant Major A. Cook, Royal Field Artillery (Kettering)
Squadron Sergeant Major G. B. Cook, Hussars (Colchester)
Acting Seaman T. Coombe  (Durham)
Regimental Quartermaster Sergeant A. G. Cooper, Somerset Light Infantry (Highbridge)
Sergeant R. Coote, Nottinghamshire & Derbyshire Regiment (E. Derby)
Sergeant T. Cordingley, Royal Garrison Artillery (Irlam)
Sergeant P. Corish, Royal Irish Fusiliers (Dublin)
Private R. C. Cotton, Seaforth Highlanders (Oxford)
Private J. Cox, Worcestershire Regiment (Glastonbury)
Corporal J. Cox, Royal Field Artillery (Bicester)
Company Sergeant Major W. O. Cox, Machine Gun Corps (Ladywood)
Sergeant A. Coyle, Army Corps of Clerks (Slade Lane)
Company Sergeant Major R. Craig, King's Own Scottish Borderers (Edinburgh)
Corporal F. A. Crane, Middlesex Regiment (Canning Town)
Sergeant W. Crawford, Royal Engineers (Kelty)
Sergeant C. B. Crocker, Royal Field Artillery (Chaterfield)
Corporal H. J. Croome, Army Corps of Clerks (Gloucester)
2nd Corporal W. Crowe, Royal Engineers (Bishop Auckland)
Sergeant A. Cundy, Royal Field Artillery (Nottingham)
Sergeant Major T. Cunnew, Royal Garrison Artillery (Limehouse, E.)
Sergeant F. Cuthbert, Tank Corps (Lether.ingham)
Sergeant Major H. F. Cuthbert, Royal Garrison Artillery (Dover)
Sapper J. R. K. Dacre, Royal Engineers (Freemantle, Australia)
Private H. Dale, Duke of Cornwall's Light Infantry (Madrow)
Sergeant A. E. Dalton, Royal Garrison Artillery (Jersey)
Sergeant P. J. Daly, Irish Guards (Ballycallan)
Sergeant Major L. Darch, Hussars (Pontypridd)
Private F. Davies, Durham Light Infantry (Durham)
Company Sergeant Major J. F. Davies, Worcestershire Regiment (Nord, France)
Sergeant J. R. Davies, Machine Gun Corps (St. Albans)
Sergeant T. Davies, Royal Welsh Fusiliers (Wrexham)
Private T. J. Davies, Welsh Regiment (Merthyr Tydfil)
Driver W. Davies, Royal Field Artillery (Liverpool)
Sergeant Major H. Davoile, Royal Field Artillery (Coventry)
Company Sergeant Major E. W. Day, Grenadier Guards (Pimlico)
Company Sergeant Major W. A. Day, London Regiment (Highbury)
Corporal E. S. Dennis, Nottinghamshire & Derbyshire Regiment (Nottingham)
Sapper W. J. Dewdney, Royal Engineers (Portslade)
Company Sergeant Major T. Dick, Tank Corps (Newcastle upon Tyne)
Corporal J. A. Dingwall, Royal Garrison Artillery (Muswell Hill)
Sergeant J. Dixon, Lancashire Fusiliers (Warrington)
Private G. Doddemeade, Manchester Regiment (Bakewell)
Sergeant T. Dolphin, Royal Field Artillery (Sheffield)
Brigadier R. Donaldson, Royal Field Artillery (Liverpool)
Sergeant E. Donnelly, Liverpool Regiment (Liverpool)
Sergeant Major J. Donnelly, Highland Light Infantry (Morpeth)
Sergeant C. Donovan, King's Own Shropshire Light Infantry (Ebbw Vale)
Corporal F. Doughty, Royal Garrison Artillery (Cambridge)
Corporal A. Douglas, Royal Garrison Artillery (Dundee)
Sergeant H. E. Dowling, Royal Army Medical Corps (Manchester)
Acting Seaman R. O. Downie  (Wallsend-on-Tyne)
Sergeant T. Downie, Labour Corps (Edinburgh)
Sapper T. Drake, Royal Engineers (Leeds)
Company Quartermaster Sergeant J. E. Duck, Royal Engineers (Swindon)
Private E. Duckworth, Lab. Corps (Stockport)
Acting Brigadier C. Duffin, Royal Field Artillery (Tilehurst)
Company Sergeant Major W. Dunk, Royal West Kent Regiment (Dulwich)
Sergeant Major G. Dunger, Royal Field Artillery (Regent's Park, N.W.)
Private J. Dunn, Manchester Regiment (Bolton, Lanes.)
Private F. Dyson, Royal Welsh Fusiliers (Reddish, Stockport)
Battery Quartermaster Sergeant H. G. Bastes, Royal Field Artillery (Harrow Road, W.)
Lance Corporal W. G. A. Eatwell, South Staffordshire Regiment (St. John's Wood)
Corporal F. E. Edgington, Royal Engineers (Cassington, nr. Eynsham)
Sergeant L. F. Edwards, Machine Gun Corps (Burton-on-Trent)
Brigadier F. J. Egan, Royal Garrison Artillery (Dublin)
Lance Corporal W. P. Egles, Rifle Brigade (Streatham, S.W)
Corporal H. Element, Machine Gun Corps (Leyton)
Private S. A. G. Elliott, Tank Corps (Wilmington)
Staff Sergeant G. T. Elliott, Army Service Corps (Weymouth)
Battery Sergeant Major C. Ellis, Royal Field Artillery (Sheffield)
Company Sergeant Major H. C. Ellis, Royal Engineers (Sheffield)
Lance Corporal H. Emery, Middlesex Regiment (Finsbury Park)
Sergeant C. Evans, Royal Field Artillery (Walsall)
Sergeant D. G. Evans, Royal Welsh Fusiliers (Ruthin)
Corporal E. Evans, Royal Fusiliers (Tunstall)
Company Sergeant Major G. E. Evans, South Staffordshire Regiment (Wolverhampton)
Sergeant H. C. Evans, Royal Engineers (Martens)
Private J. L. Evans, Worcestershire Regiment (Bilston)
Private R. W. Evans, Royal Welsh Fusiliers (Wrexham)
Sergeant T. Evans, Royal Field Artillery (Farnham)
Sergeant Major H. J. Farley, Worcestershire Regiment (Worcester)
Sergeant D. Farrar, Lancashire Fusiliers (Salford)
Company Sergeant Major C. Featherstone, King's Own Yorkshire Light Infantry (Rotherham)
Sergeant G. R. Felgate, Royal Garrison Artillery (Dovercourt)
Sergeant G. Fenton, Royal Engineers (Glasgow)
Corporal J. Finnie, Royal Scots (Lesmahagow)
Temp Sergeant Major A. S. Fisher, Royal Field Artillery (Plumstead)
Private T. Flannigan, Cameron Highlanders (Edinburgh)
Sergeant M. Flatt, Machine Gun Corps (Bedingfield)
Sergeant W. Fletcher, Lancashire Fusiliers (Bury)
Sergeant W. Fletcher, Royal Field Artillery (Wolverhampton)
Private J. Forrest, Royal Inniskilling Fusiliers (Airdrie)
Sergeant A. Foster, Royal Highlanders (Glasgow)
Sergeant C. B. Foster, East Surrey Regiment (S. Benfield)
Private W. J. Foster  Rifle Brigade (Stourport)
Sapper J. Fowler, Royal Engineers (Huddersfield)
Sergeant W. Fowler, Tank Field Company (Bedford)
Brigadier W. J. Fowler, Royal Field Artillery (Polegates)
Corporal F. Fox, Royal Engineers (Middlesboro)
Corporal G. France, King's Own Yorkshire Light Infantry (Pontefract)
Driver M. Frost, Royal Field Artillery (Pontypridd)
Lance Corporal A. Froud, Gloucestershire Regiment (Swindon)
Sergeant Major J. Fuller, Royal Field Artillery (Gorleston)
Sergeant F. Gains, Yorkshire Regiment (Sutton)
Sergeant A. Gamble, Royal Garrison Artillery (Melton Mowbray)
Sergeant A. E. Gardiner, Royal Engineers (Chiswick)
Company Sergeant Major J. Gardiner, Gordon Highlanders (Aberdeen)
Regimental Quartermaster Sergeant H. Gentry, Essex Regiment (N. Woolwich)
Corporal W. T. Gibbs, South Wales Borderers (Oairan Bridgend)
Company Sergeant Major D. Gilchrist, Argyll & Sutherland Highlanders (Cardiff)
Acting Sergeant W. Gill, Lancashire Fusiliers (Chesterfield)
Sergeant H. Glanville, Manchester Regiment (Watford)
Sergeant S. H. Good, Royal Field Artillery (Lee, S.E.)
Sergeant Major M. Gordon, Royal Field Artillery (Fermoy)
Private W. Gothard, King's Own Yorkshire Light Infantry (Sheffield)
Corporal W. E. Grady, Royal Field Artillery (Hayling Island)
Company Sergeant Major N. J. Graham, Loyal North Lancashire Regiment (Bolton)
Company Sergeant Major R. Granger, Lancashire Fusiliers (Portsmouth)
Sergeant J. Gration, London Regiment (Ripley)
Sergeant P. Gray, Royal Field Artillery (Liverpool)
Company Sergeant Major W. T. Gray, Northamptonshire Regiment (Thrapston)
Sergeant A. Green, Royal Army Medical Corps (Hull)
2nd Corporal F. Green, Royal Engineers (Rarnsley)
Company Sergeant Major H. Green, Royal Welsh Fusiliers (Chorley)
Sergeant W. Grwnleaf, Royal Lancaster Regiment ([E.] Colchester)
Sergeant S. P. Griffen, Royal Engineers (Southam)
Brigadier E. Griffiths, Royal Field Artillery (Cradley Heath)
Sergeant J. E. Grinham, Royal Lancaster Regiment (S. Croydon)
Acting Brigadier C. Groves, Royal Field Artillery (Slough)
Sergeant H. F. Gwyer, Royal Field Artillery (Coulsdon)
Sergeant W. Hale, Royal Engineers (Parkhurston)
Sergeant A. Hall, Lincolnshire Regiment (Lincoln)
Sapper E. M. Hall, Royal Engineers (Stoke-on-Trent)
Sergeant T. Halligan, Northumberland Fusiliers (Choppington)
Sergeant J. Hamilton, Royal Irish Rifles (Carrickfergus)
Sergeant E. F. Hammond, Royal Engineers (Teignmouth)
Sergeant H. Hammond, Rifle Brigade (King's Lynn)
Brigadier. H. W. Hancock, Royal Garrison Artillery (Teddington)
Corporal A. E. Hand, Manchester Regiment (Manchester)
Sergeant D. Hardesty, Royal Engineers (Kensington, W.)
Corporal T. Hardman, Royal Field Artillery (Dawley)
Gunner P. Hards, Royal Garrison Artillery (Haywards Heath)
Company Sergeant Major W. Hargreaves, Machine Gun Corps (Bridgeton)
Company Sergeant Major A. S. Harle, Northumberland Fusiliers (Monkseaton)
Corporal W. J. Harper, Royal Engineers (St. Helens)
Sergeant A. Harrington, Essex Regiment (Braintree)
Sergeant A. Harris, Royal Scots Fusiliers (Glasgow)
Corporal G. S. Harris, York and Lancaster Regiment (Rotherham)
Company Quartermaster Sergeant J. Harris, Royal Engineers (Sheffield)
Sergeant J. W. Harrison, Royal Engineers (Willesden)
Company Sergeant Major W. E. Hartcutts, Leicestershire Regiment (Melton Mowbray)
Lance Sergeant R. Hartley  West Riding Regiment (Ilkley)
Sergeant H. Harvey, Hussars (Bromley by Bow)
Sergeant B. Hatto, London Regiment (Chelsea)
Private J. J. Hawker, Army Service Corps (Reading)
Sergeant W. Hawkes, Royal Field Artillery (Birmingham)
Sergeant E. B. Hayball, Leicestershire Regiment (Willingham)
Pioneer H. Hayes, Royal Engineers (Silksworth)
Company Sergeant Major A. Hayler, Royal Engineers (Plumstead, S.E.)
Company Sergeant Major W. V. Hazelwood, Middlesex Regiment (Tottenham)
Sergeant M. Healy  Police (Dublin)
Private W. Heard, Army Service Corps (Launceston)
Sergeant W. Hedges, Lancashire Fusiliers (Irlam o' th' Heights)
Sergeant J. Hedley, Royal Field Artillery (Cambois Blyth)
Company Sergeant Major H. Hemingway, West Yorkshire Regiment (Leeds)
Sergeant G. Henderson, R.W. Surr. K. (Rowledge)
Temp Sergeant Major G. H. Henderson, Royal Warwickshire Regiment (Caterham Valley)
Sergeant J. W. Henderson, West Yorkshire Regiment (Harrogate)
Company Sergeant Major W. Herridge, Royal Sussex Regiment (Kemp Town)
Corporal A. Hewit, Royal Indian Artillery (Edinburgh)
Sergeant J. R. Hey, Royal Engineers (Barnsley)
Regimental Major A. M. Hill  Grenadier Guards (Battersea)
Staff Sergeant Major G. Hill, Army Service Corps (Forest Hill, S.E.)
Private F. L. Hill, Army Service Corps (Folkestone)
Lance Corporal A. J. Hillier, Somerset Light Infantry (Frome)
Corporal F. T. Hills, Royal Engineers (Chelmsford)
Sergeant H. S. Hills, Suffolk Regiment (Abbington Park, Cambridge)
Sergeant Major H. J. Hines, Royal Garrison Artillery (Street)
Sergeant J. Hird, Royal Field Artillery (Carlisle)
Sergeant A. S. Hitchcock, Royal Engineers (Powderham)
Private J. Hockley, Army Service Corps, attd. Tank Corps (Acton, W.)
Sergeant H. Holden, South Staffordshire Regiment (Wolverhampton)
Corporal A. E. Hollingdale, Royal Field Artillery (Bow, E.)
Corporal A. Hollow, Royal Berkshire Regiment (High Lanes, Hoyle)
Sergeant H. Holmes, Royal Field Artillery (Kilwinning)
Private S. Holmes, King's Own Yorkshire Light Infantry (Fryston)
Company Sergeant Major H. Holt, South Lancashire Regiment (Warrington)
Battery Quartermaster Sergeant E. D. Hopkins, Royal Field Artillery (Portsmouth)
2nd Corporal J. H. Hopkinson, Royal Engineers (Mansfield)
Sergeant J. Horsfield, Manchester Regiment (Ashton-under-Lyne)
Company Sergeant Major T. Howard, Machine Gun Corps (King's Cross)
Private C. Howarth, King's Own Yorkshire Light Infantry, attd. Trench Mortar Battery (Sheffield)
Sergeant M. Howarth, Royal Field Artillery (Didsbury)
Sergeant A. Hughes, Army Service Corps (Belfast)
Company Quartermaster Sergeant J. Hughes, Royal Welsh Fusiliers (Carnarvon)
Corporal B. Hulme, Royal Engineers (Wilmslow)
Sergeant W. Hunt, Royal Fusiliers (Acton)
Gunner F. Ideson, Royal Horse Artillery (Keighley)
Sergeant H. E. lies, Welsh Regiment (Norbiton)
Sergeant E. G. W. Ingram, Royal West Surrey Regiment (S. Norwood)
Sergeant J. Ingham, East Lancashire Regiment (Padiham)
Sergeant A. Isaacs, Somerset Light Infantry (Middlesboro')
Sergeant W. H. Isherwood, Loyal North Lancashire Regiment (Bolton)
Private E. J. Ivens, Hampshire Regiment (Skipstone-on-Stone)
Gunner J. Jackson, Royal Field Artillery (Bamber Bridge)
Corporal J. H. E. Jackson, Durham Light Infantry (Wolverhampton)
Sergeant T. Jackson, East Yorkshire Regiment (Sheffield)
Sergeant T. Jackson, Royal Garrison Artillery (Halesworth)
Sergeant Major G. Jakeman, Royal Garrison Artillery (E. London)
Sergeant D. G. James, Cameron Highlanders (Glasgow)
Sergeant H. L. James, R. Guernsey Light Infantry (King's Cross, London)
Sergeant M. James, Royal Horse Artillery, attd. Royal Field Artillery (Neath)
Company Sergeant Major J. Jamieson, Machine Gun Corps (Belfast)
Company Sergeant Major S. Jeffries, London Regiment (Enfield)
Sergeant G. W. Jennings, Royal Garrison Artillery (Bristol)
Gunner H. A. Jennings, Royal Field Artillery (Shadwell)
Trooper C. H. A. Johnson, Yeomanry (Tyne Dock)
Sergeant Major G. Johnson, Dragoons (Colchester)
Sergeant T. N. Johnson, Royal Engineers (Twyford)
Sergeant A. Jones, Lancashire Fusiliers (Manchester)
Company Sergeant Major F. Jones, King's Own Yorkshire Light Infantry (Wakefield)
Sergeant H. Jones  Machine Gun Corps (Manor Park)
Sapper W. Jones, Royal Engineers (Liverpool)
Private W. D. Jones, Border Regiment (Manchester)
2nd Corporal W. Jukes, Royal Engineers (Templecombe)
Corporal J. H. Kelsey, Royal Warwickshire Regiment (Warwick)
Sergeant J. Kennedy, East Yorkshire Regiment (Birmingham)
Sergeant E. Kent, Royal Field Artillery (Watford)
Company Sergeant Major W. J. Kenton, Cheshire Regiment (W. Ham, London)
Sergeant J. W. Kerridge, Middlesex Regiment (Kimberley, S.A.)
Corporal H. King, Royal Engineers (Dewsbury)
Company Sergeant Major R. Kirby, Durham Light Infantry (Darlington)
Sergeant J. Kirk, Royal Engineers (Elderslie)
Sergeant J. Kirkman, Machine Gun Corps (Northwick)
Brigadier W. D. Kitchener, Royal Field Artillery (Swanley)
Smith/Shipwright G. W. Knight, Royal Garrison Artillery (Leicester)
Private F. Lamb, Rifle Brigade (Binstead, Ryde)
Company Sergeant Major W. Lamb, Nottinghamshire & Derbyshire Regiment (Derby)
Brigadier P. Lane, Royal Field Artillery (Darwen)
Sergeant T. Lane, Hampshire Regiment (Bromley)
Sergeant Major J. G. Langton, Royal Field Artillery (Earl's Court)
Lance Corporal R. D. Lavender, Royal Engineers (King's Cross, London)
Lance Corporal E. Lawrence, Military Mounted Police (Canterbury)
Sergeant S. D. Lawrence, Royal Field Artillery (Fraserburgh)
Lance Corporal W. J. Lawson, Royal Engineers (Hendon, Sunderland)
Sergeant T. N. Leah, Royal Field Artillery (Liverpool)
Acting Sergeant Major A. Lee, East Surrey Regiment (Fulharn)
Sergeant U. J. Lee, King's Royal Rifle Corps (Greenwich)
Sergeant Major W. F. Leeder, Royal Field Artillery (Wimbledon)
Company Sergeant Major J. C. Lees, Royal Scots (Tranent)
Corporal D. Lennie, Royal Engineers (Dalmuir)
Corporal A. Lennox, Royal Engineers (Chepstow)
Lance Corporal F. Leonard, Machine Gun Corps (Cardiff)
Foreman of Works Staff Sergeant A. M. Letford, Establishment for Engin. Serv. (Gillingham)
Company Quartermaster Sergeant J. Lewis, Essex Regiment (Dovercourt)
Sergeant T. Lewis, Northumberland Fusiliers (Newcastle upon Tyne)
Company Sergeant Major W. C. Lewis  Wiltshire Regiment (Putney)
Sergeant W. S. Lim, Army Service Corps (Tooting)
Company Sergeant Major F. Lister  King's Royal Rifle Corps (Woolwich)
Private D. A. Little, Liverpool Regiment, attd. Light Trench Mortar Battery (Liverpool)
Sergeant J. Logan, Machine Gun Corps (Newtonmore)
Sergeant R. Lomax, Royal Army Medical Corps (Nelson)
Company Sergeant Major W. J. Longley, Middlesex Regiment (Ratherhithe)
Acting Sergeant C. Lovell, Welsh Regiment (Treforest)
Private W. Lowe, Royal Dublin Fusiliers (Oswaldtwisitle)
Sergeant Major J. Lowery, Royal Garrison Artillery (Newcastle upon Tyne)
Sergeant M. McArdle, Machine Gun Corps (Castleblaney)
Private P. McArdle, Labour Corps (Glasgow)
Sergeant D. Macarthur, Seaforth Highlanders (Stornoway)
Lance Corporal R. McCabe, Welsh Regiment (St. Helens)
Corporal W. McCarthy, Royal Garrison Artillery (Cork)
Company Sergeant Major G. McCellan, Manchester Regiment (Manchester)
Sergeant T. McClelland, Irish Guards (Londonderry)
Sapper W. G. McConnell, Royal Engineers (Shrewsbury)
Corporal A. McDonald, Royal Scots (Avonbridge)
Company Sergeant Major T. McDonald  Manchester Regiment (Bury)
Sergeant D. MicFarlane, King's Own Scottish Borderers (Kilsyth)
Corporal of Horse P. A. Macintosh, Life Gds (Edinburgh)
Sergeant T. Mackay, Royal Garrison Artillery (Dundee)
Colonel G. McKie, Cameron Highlanders, attd. Trench Mortar Battery (Barrhill)
Lance Corporal W. Mackie  Gordon Highlanders (Huntly)
Private D. McKinney, Irish Guards (Glasgow)
Sergeant W. McLaren, Royal Engineers (Glasgow)
Private R. D. McLean, Army Service Corps
Corporal W. H. MacLean  Royal Engineers (Glasgow)
Private J. R. Macleod, London Regiment (Ardgay)
Sergeant G. MacRitchie, London Regiment (Dunblane)
Battery Quartermaster Sergeant H. A. Maddox, Royal Horse Artillery (Selby)
Private W. C. Mallatrat; Nottinghamshire & Derbyshire Regiment (Mansfield)
Company Sergeant Major T. W. Manktelow, London Regiment (Barnsbury Road, N.)
Corporal T. D. Maple, Royal Garrison Artillery (Kensington Park)
Sergeant H. T. Marie, King's Royal Rifle Corps (London, S.E.)
Regimental Sergeant Major A. M. Marr, Northumberland Fusiliers (Glasgow)
Sergeant Major W. Marriott, Royal Field Artillery (Alfreton)
Sergeant Major W. Marriott, Royal Field Artillery (Downham Market)
Sergeant W. C. Marshall, Machine Gun Corps (Lindal-in-Furness)
Corporal G. Martin, Royal Field Artillery
Act. Regimental Sergeant Major W. J. Mash, Rifle Brigade (Greenwich)
Private H. Mason, Machine Gun Corps (Stockton Heath)
Sergeant H. H. Mather, Royal Field Artillery (Eagley Bank)
Company Sergeant Major J. Mathers, Royal Irish Rifles (Belfast)
Company Sergeant Major W. H. Mathie, Highland Light Infantry (Glasgow)
Sergeant H. C. Mathieson, Royal Garrison Artillery (Midlothian)
Corporal G. Matthews, Northumberland Fusiliers (Farnham)
Sergeant M. Mayson, Lancers (Barrow)
Private R. Mellish, Royal Berkshire Regiment (Lambeth)
Sergeant J. Meredith, Royal Welsh Fusiliers (Birkenhead)
Sapper W. H. Message, Royal Engineers (Eastbourne)
Sapper J. Millar, Royal Engineers (Kirkcaldy)
Sergeant Major D. Miller, Royal Irish Rifles (Dillon Cross)
Battery Quartermaster Sergeant G. Miller, Argyll & Sutherland Highlanders (Alloa)
Sergeant F. Millward, Royal Field Artillery (Leek)
Private G. E. Minert, East Surrey Regiment (Camberwell)
Acting Corporal J. Mitchell Royal Scots (Glasgow)
Private J. J. Molyneaux, Lancashire Fusiliers (Wigan)
Sergeant P. M. Money, London Regiment (Westminster)
Sergeant J. Moody, Royal Field Artillery (Leeds)
Sergeant F. Moore, Leicestershire Regiment (Leicester)
Quartermaster Sergeant J. Moore, Royal Army Medical Corps (Edinburgh)
Company Sergeant Major J. W. Moore, Liverpool Regiment (Liverpool)
Sergeant L. J. Moore, Machine Gun Corps (Hackness)
Private P. Moran, Royal Dublin Fusiliers (Dublin)
Corporal D. J. Morgan, Royal Garrison Artillery (Pontypridd)
Sergeant W. Morgan, Labour Corps (Warington)
Corporal J. Morrine, Royal Engineers (Dumfries)
Lance Corporal B. Morris, North Staffordshire Regiment (Stafford)
Acting Company Sergeant Major G. J. Morris, South Wales Borderers (Newport)
Company Sergeant Major J. W. Morris, Royal Engineers (Bethnal Green, N.E.)
Lance Corporal R. Morris, Loyal North Lancashire Regiment (Bolton)
Corporal W R. Morrish  Royal Engineers (Bristol)
Lance Corporal W. Mounter, Royal Engineers (Clapham Common, S.W.)
Brigadier R. Muckersie, Royal Field Artillery (Methil)
Sapper J. Mulcahy, Royal Engineers (Cork)
Sergeant E. Murphy, Liverpool Regiment (Liverpool)
Sergeant L. J. Mursell, Royal Garrison Artillery (Southampton)
Corporal J. Naylon, Seaforth Highlanders (Bolton)
Sergeant W. Neill, Royal Irish Fusiliers (Lurgan)
Sergeant E. G. Newman, Royal Engineers (St. Andrews)
Sergeant Major H. Newman, Royal Field Artillery (Catford
Sergeant R. J. Newman, Royal Fusiliers (Radlett)
Company Sergeant Major T. J. Newton, Middlesex Regiment (Finsbury Park)
Sergeant Major W. G. Newton, North Lancashire Regiment (Devon)
Sergeant J. Nicholls, King's Own Yorkshire Light Infantry (Kinsley, nr. Wakefield)
Sergeant J. Nicol, Yorkshire Regiment (Bedale)
Private J. North, Yorkshire Regiment (Aylesbury)
Sergeant S. A. Northrop, Royal Engineers (Walthamstow)
Regimental Quartermaster Sergeant W. Northwood, Nottinghamshire & Derbyshire Regiment (Mapperley)
Sergeant G. H. Norton, Hampshire Regiment (S. Moulton)
Sergeant R. Norton, Northumberland Fusiliers (Hirst)
Sergeant S. Nutting, South Staffordshire Regiment (Rushall)
Sergeant J. E. Odlin, Lincolnshire Regiment (Louth)
Acting Brigadier S. H. Oldham, Motor Machine Gun Service (Bagleyfields)
Private R. O'Gorman, Royal Munster Fusiliers
Sergeant W. O'Rourke, Connaught Rangers (Mullingar)
Company Sergeant Major O. Owens, Royal Welsh Fusiliers (Leicester)
Sergeant E. Page  Royal Field Artillery (Plumstead, S.E.)
Company Sergeant Major G. S. Parker, King's Own Yorkshire Light Infantry (Featherstone)
Driver L. T. Parkin, Royal Field Artillery (Haswell)
Corporal S. A. Parker, Royal Horse Artillery (Hove)
Sergeant E. Parkin, Royal Engineers (Sheffield)
Sergeant Major W. Parkin, Royal Field Artillery (Sunderland)
Sergeant F. Parnwell, Grenadier Guards (Chiswick)
Sergeant Major H. J. Parrott, Royal Field Artillery (Tottenham)
Private H. Pattison, Durham Light Infantry (Spennymoor)
Sergeant T. Pearce, Lancashire Fusiliers (Salford)
Sergeant H. F. Peel, Army Service Corps
Corporal L. S. Pegram, Royal Fusiliers (Enfield)
Lance Corporal T. M. Penny Motor Machine Gun Service (Ulverstone)
Sergeant E. Perkins, Royal Field Artillery (Sheffield)
Acting Sergeant A. Perry, South Staffordshire Regiment, attd. Light Trench Mortar Battery (Walsall)
Gunner C. J. Perry, Royal Field Artillery (Tulla, Co. Clare)
Sergeant Major E. Perryman, Royal Field Artillery
Sergeant C. R. Pettinger, Royal Engineers (Shipley)
Sergeant G. R. Phillips, Hussars (Scarboro)
Corporal T. W. J. Pine, Royal Engineers (Gillingham)
Sergeant W. Poote, Royal Garrison Artillery (Skewen)
Corporal F. W. Porter, Machine Gun Corps (Barkinside)
Sergeant H. E. Price, Liverpool Regiment (Widnes)
Sergeant W. Prioe, Royal Engineers (Pontefract)
Sapper A. Pritchard, Royal Engineers (Penarth)
Company Sergeant Major W. G. Probert, Welsh Regiment (Rhyl)
Battery Quartermaster Sergeant P. E. Pullan, Royal Field Artillery (Otley)
Sergeant G. Purves, Royal Scots (Edinburgh)
Private J. E. Quigley, North Lancashire Regiment (Bolton)
Sergeant J. Quinn, King's Own Scottish Borderers (Ratcliffe)
Sergeant A. E. Radford, Royal Field Artillery (Nottingham)
Lance Corporal J. Randle, West Yorkshire Regiment (Gomersal)
Private W. Randle, Rifle Brigade (Birmingham)
Sergeant G. F. Rawlinson, London Regiment (Paddington)
Sergeant Major W. L. Redding, Royal Field Artillery (Bradford)
Gunner E. J. Redfern, Royal Horse Artillery (Coventry)
Sergeant J. Reed, Cheshire Regiment (Durham)
Corporal W. Rennie, Royal Engineers (Liscard)
Sergeant A. R. Ridgway, West Riding Regiment (Cardiff)
Company Sergeant Major T. Riding, Nottinghamshire & Derbyshire Regiment (Burton-on-Trent)
Gunner G. D. Rigg, Royal Field Artillery (Leeds)
Private C. V. Riggs, Yeomanry, attd. Royal Engineers (Wanstead, N.E.)
Sergeant F. C. Rising  Royal Engineers (Norwich)
2nd Corporal J. Ritchie, Royal Engineers (Fraserburgh)
Sergeant A. B. Robbins, S. Wales B'ord. (Ross)
Sergeant F. W. Roberts, Royal Garrison Artillery (Sheffield)
Corporal W. G. Roberts, Royal Engineers, T.F. (Smethwick)
Sergeant E. Robinson, Lancashire Fusiliers (Salford)
Company Sergeant Major T. Robishaw, Manchester Regiment (Oldham)
Company Sergeant Major B. A. Rolfe, Machine Gun Corps (Barking)
Sergeant W. S. Rook, Rifle Brigade (Clapham)
Sergeant Major T. H. Rooke, Royal Garrison Artillery (Upper Tooting)
Sergeant G. Roper, Labour Corps (Derby)
Lance Corporal H. W. Ross, Royal Engineers (Edinburgh)
Brigadier J. H. Round, Royal Field Artillery (Bolton)
Sergeant W. C. Russell, Royal Garrison Artillery (Montrose)
Lance Corporal H. Sadd, Royal Marines (Norwich)
2nd Corporal F. Sanders, Royal Engineers (Stourbridge)
Fitter H. Schofield, Royal Field Artillery (Blackburn)
Private J. R. Scott, Army Service Corps (Streatham)
Corporal R. Scott, Argyll & Sutherland Highlanders (Perth)
Sergeant D. Seddon, Royal Engineers (Bolton)
Sergeant H. Seller, Royal Field Artillery (Bognor)
Corporal W. Semple, Royal Garrison Artillery (Kirkintilloch)
Private A. Shaw, Army Service Corps (Burnley)
Sergeant C. Shaw, Royal Field Artillery (Horsforth)
Sapper J. Shaw, Royal Engineers (Warwick Sq., S.W.)
Sergeant E. Shepherd, Royal Field Artillery (Bolton)
Corporal W. Shires, Royal Field Artillery (Rodley)
Sergeant Major W. T. Shirreffs, Royal Field Artillery (Aberdeen)
Private T. W. Sholicar, Lancashire Fusiliers (Ormskirk)
Sergeant H. G. Sigournay, Lin. Regiment (Stratford, E.)
Corporal A. Simons, Machine Gun Corps (St. Ives)
Company Quartermaster Sergeant T. B. Simons, Manchester Regiment (Shepherd's Bush)
Sergeant A. Simpson, Royal Field Artillery (Fermoy)
Company Sergeant Major E. Simpson, Lin. Regiment (Skellingthorpe)
Private J. Simpson,' Royal Welsh Fusiliers (Coventry)
Company Sergeant Major H. Skinner, Manchester Regiment (Heaton Park, Manchester)
Private C. Smith, Royal Army Medical Corps (Winchester)
Private E. Smith, Lancashire Fusiliers (Lanes Bridge, nr. Colne)
Sapper G. H. S. Smith, Royal Engineers (Edinburgh)
Sergeant O. G. Smith, London Regiment (Dalston)
Sergeant P. Smith, South Lancashire Regiment (Warrington)
Private R. J. Smith, East Lancashire Regiment (Darwen)
Sergeant T. Smith, Bedfordshire Regiment (St. Albans)
Acting Sergeant Major W. E. Smith, Royal Lancaster Regiment (London)
Sergeant R. Smyth, Royal Inniskilling Fusiliers (Carrowtrasna)
Sergeant F. Snow, Lancashire Fusiliers (Manchester)
Sergeant G. F. Snow, King's Royal Rifle Corps (Radford)
Brigadier F. Sowerby, Royal Field Artillery (Darlington)
Sergeant J. Speace, Royal Engineers (Tranent)
Sergeant W. Sporle, Manchester Regiment (Bowes Park, London)
Lance Corporal H. E. A. Squelch, Royal Engineers (Bromley Common)
Lance Corporal E. G. Stagg, King's Royal Rifle Corps (Croydon)
Sergeant F. Stevens, Royal Engineers (Wootton Bassett)
Company Sergeant Major A. Stezaker, East Lancashire Regiment (Burnley)
Company Sergeant Major G. C. Stirton. Tank Corps (Glasgow)
Brigadier W. Stockdale, Royal Field Artillery (Hull)
Private C. Storey, West Yorkshire Regiment (Leeds)
Sergeant J. Strang, Tank Corps (Kirkintillock)
Company Sergeant Major W. J. Stubbington, King's Royal Rifle Corps (W. Horsley)
Sergeant C. C. Sumner, Royal Field Artillery (Coventry)
Lance Corporal H. Sutton, Military Mounted Police (St. Helens)
Lance Corporal G. Swain  King's Own Yorkshire Light Infantry (Middlesbrough)
Petty Officer H. S. Swallow  (Uxborough)
Company Sergeant Major J. C. Simnett, King's Own Yorkshire Light Infantry (Stockport)
Sergeant Major P. A. Taber, Royal Garrison Artillery (Lydd)
Company Sergeant Major C. B. Taggart, Royal Irish Rifles (Belfast)
Sergeant R. Tait, Royal Engineers (Longidge, nr. Preston)
Sergeant B. Talbot, Machine Gun Corps (Smethwick)
Lance Bombardier E. Tarns, Royal Garrison Artillery (Longton)
Sergeant Major J. E. Tate, Royal Field Artillery (Kidderminster)
Lance Corporal P. Tatton, Royal Engineers (Stoke-on-Trent)
Company Sergeant Major B. Taylor, Royal Inniskilling Fusiliers (Hayes)
Private F. Taylor, East Lancashire Regiment (Burnley)
Sergeant Major F. H. Taylor, Gloucestershire Regiment (Cheltenham)
Sergeant R. Taylor, Royal Field Artillery (Oswaldtwistle)
Sergeant A. Teague, Royal Engineers (Dudley)
Sergeant E. Terry, South Staffordshire Regiment (Appleton)
Corporal G. J. Thomas  Labour Corps (Camberwell, London)
Private W. Thomas, Machine Gun Corps (Everton)
Company Quartermaster Sergeant J. Threadgold, King's Own Shropshire Light Infantry (Bow, London)
Acting Sergeant W. Tidmas, Leicestershire Regiment (Leicester)
Sergeant T. Timms, Oxfordshire & Buckinghamshire Light Infantry (Oxford)
Sergeant G. Tivendale, Royal Highlanders (Kirkcaldy)
Foreman of Works S. Sergeant C. S. Tonks  Royal Engineers (Liverpool)
Company Quartermaster Sergeant P. Topping, King's Own Shropshire Light Infantry (Lichfield)
Sergeant Major J. R. Towler, Royal Garrison Artillery (Ulceby, R.S.O.)
Sergeant C. G. Townroe, Machine Gun Corps (Mansfield)
Corporal E. A. Trumper, Bedfordshire Regiment (Watford)
Sergeant Major C. Turner, Royal Field Artillery (Manchester)
Company Sergeant Major J. W. Tutt  Royal Sussex Regiment (Eastbourne)
Gunner R. Twomey, Royal Garrison Artillery (Mallow)
Sergeant W. G. Upton  Machine Gun Corps (Colchester)
Lance Sergeant D. Torquhart, Royal Scots Fusiliers (Edinburgh)
Corporal B. Vaughan, London Regiment (Goodmayes)
Sergeant Major W. Venables, Royal Garrison Artillery (Birmingham)
Gunner A. A. Vickers, Royal Field Artillery (Bolton)
Sergeant A. Waddell  Argyll & Sutherland Highlanders (Glasgow)
Sergeant G. W. Waite, Royal Engineers (Redbourn)
Sergeant H. W. J. Walker, Royal Fusiliers (Southwark)
Gunner L. Walker, Royal Horse Artillery (Enfield)
Company Sergeant Major T. Walker, Lancashire Fusiliers (Manchester)
Lance Corporal W. Walker, Machine Gun Corps
Company Sergeant Major G. E. Walton, Lincolnshire Regiment (Grimsby)
Private B. Ward, Royal Munster Fusiliers (Rotherham)
Sergeant E. Ward, Seaforth Highlanders (Scarborough)
Company Sergeant Major R. W. Wardropper, Durham Light Infantry (Sunderland)
Company Sergeant Major S. Waring, Machine Gun Corps (Lisburn)
Lance Sergeant M. Watson  (Wakefield)
Sergeant R. F. Watson, Scottish Rifles (Tipton)
Acting Sergeant M. Watts, Yeomanry (Queen Camel)
Sergeant S. Waywell, Highland Light Infantry (Hulme)
Company Quartermaster Sergeant E. C. Webb, West Riding Regiment (Wordsley)
Sergeant S. Weedon  Royal Engineers (Middlesbrough)
Sapper F. Welbum, Royal Engineers (Leeds)
Sergeant C. Weldon, King's Own Yorkshire Light Infantry
Company Sergeant Major A. P. West, Lancashire Fusiliers (Weymouth)
Sergeant E. West, Machine Gun Corps (Larkbare)
Sergeant J. Whalley, Royal Engineers (Bradford)
Corporal W. K. Wheatley, East Yorkshire Regiment (Durham)
Brigadier G. Whelbourn, Royal Horse Artillery (Wragby, Lines.)
Private C. White, Army Service Corps (Wandsworth)
Driver T. J. White, Royal Horse Artillery (Bath)
Sergeant W. E. White, Duke of Cornwall's Light Infantry (Penzance)
Corporal H. Whitehead, Manchester Regiment (Oldham)
Company Sergeant Major W. Whitehead  Nottinghamshire & Derbyshire Regiment (Ilkeston)
Sergeant H. Whiteley, Royal Field Artillery (Leeds)
Company Sergeant Major E. L. Wickes, London Regiment (Denmark Hill)
Company Sergeant Major J. Wild, Royal Engineers (S. Woodford)
Sergeant J. W. Willans, Northumberland Fusiliers (Newcastle upon Tyne)
Sergeant A. Willerton, Machine Gun Corps (Stalybridge)
Sergeant A. Williams, Northumberland Fusiliers (Yeadon, nr. Leeds)
Driver D. T. Williams, Army Service Corps (Llantrissant)
Corporal R. A. Williams, Liverpool Regiment (Liverpool)
Sergeant W. Williams  Monmouthshire Regiment (Newbridge)
Corporal T. Williamson, King's Own Scottish Borderers, attd. Trench Mortar Battery (Glasgow)
Sergeant T. Williamson, South Lancashire Regiment (Warington)
Regimental Quartermaster Sergeant W. A. Williamson, Leicestershire Regiment (Langley Mill)
Private A. Wilson, Gordon Highlanders (Cullen)
Sergeant D. B. Wilson, London Regiment (Camden Town)
Sergeant J. Wilson, Royal Field Artillery (Sutton-in-Ashfield)
Corporal J. Wilson, Royal Engineers (Kilmarnock)
Sergeant R. F. Wilson, Manchester Regiment, attd. Light Trench Mortar Battery (Cheetham, Manchester)
Sergeant C. H. Wingate, Army Service Corps (Leeds)
Battery Sergeant Major H. E. Wingate, Royal Horse Artillery (Tenby)
Sergeant Major F. W. Wise, Manchester Regiment (Plymouth)
Sergeant H Wood, Gloucestershire Regiment, attd. Light Trench Mortar Battery (Gloucester)
Sergeant Major T. A. Wood, Royal Garrison Artillery (Sligo)
Sergeant T. H. Wood, Manchester Regiment (Runcorn)
Corporal R. Woodard, Argyll & Sutherland Highlanders (S. Baling)
Regimental Quartermaster Sergeant A. F. Woodham, West Yorkshire Regiment (Shepherd's Bush)
Sergeant A. C. W. Woodhouse, Royal Marine Artillery (Southsea)
2nd Corporal W. J. Woodrow, Royal Engineers (U. Tooting)
Company Quartermaster Sergeant J. Woods, Royal Inniskilling Fusiliers (Ballinamallard)
Regimental Quartermaster Sergeant C. G. Wren, London Regiment (Battersea)
Sergeant H. B. Wrench, King's Royal Rifle Corps (Warrington)
Private D. Wright, Royal Irish Regiment. (New Ross)
Sergeant W. A. Wright, North Staffordshire Regiment, attd. Light Trench Mortar Battery (Worksop)
Sergeant W. E. Wright, Machine Gun Corps (Woolwich)
Sergeant G. E. Yates, Royal Garrison Artillery (Jersey)
Company Sergeant Major J. E. Young, Manchester Regiment (Hulme, Manchester)
Sergeant W. R. Young, Royal Garrison Artillery (Greenwich)

Canadian Force
Company Sergeant Major A. Bailie, Infantry
Sergeant J. M. Bain, Canadian Railways Construction Corps
Sergeant J. E. Barker, Engineers
Sergeant G. Blake, Infantry
Lance Corporal J. Bowley, Engineers
Corporal B. L. Broughton, Field Artillery
Sergeant J. D. Burnet, Garrison Artillery
Battery Sergeant Major. F. Butler, Infantry
Staff Sergeant S. H. Bye, Army Medical Corps
Pioneer J. W. Chaddock, Engineers
Regimental G.M.S. A. Champagne, Infantry
Sergeant M. Dempsey, Infantry
Sergeant Major A. W. Dewolf, Garrison Artillery
Sergeant F. Douglas, Infantry
Sergeant D. Dunbar, Infantry
Sergeant Major J. Farr, Infantry
Private W. C. Ferguson, Infantry
Sergeant A. Findley  Infantry
Sergeant S. G. Fogg, Field Artillery
Private S. T. Foster, Mounted Rifles
Sergeant L. Fox, Infantry
Sergeant Major G. H. Fry, Field Artillery
Company Quartermaster Sergeant W. R. Garrison, Infantry O.N.
Corporal W. Holahan, Raily. Con. Corps
Sergeant D. R. Honeyman, Infantry
Sergeant H. W. Hopkins, Infantry
Battery Quartermaster Sergeant T. M. Hyman, Field Artillery
Corporal L. D. Johnson, Engineers
Sergeant D. C. Johnstone, Engineers
Private H. Kift, Infantry
Sergeant A. E. Lang, Railways Troops
Sergeant Major G. G. Lawson, Machine Gun Corps
Company Sergeant Major W. E. Lawson, Infantry
Sergeant F. A. Lyons, Mounted Rifles
Company Sergeant Major F. E. Mantle, Infantry
2nd Corporal W. F. Marsh, Engineers
Company Sergeant Major H. O. Matthews, Infantry
Sergeant Major C. E. McArthur, Army Medical Corps
Sergeant A. R. McCue, Artillery
Sergeant Major J. McNamara, Field Artillery
Corporal N. McK. McRae, Infantry
Sergeant S. G. Moore, Infantry
Company Sergeant Major T. C. Morrison, Infantry
Sergeant H. J. Mortimer, Field Artillery
Company Sergeant Major J. P. Murphy, Infantry
Corporal R. S. Murphy, Infantry
Sergeant B. Nelson, Field Artillery
Sergeant C. Novis, Infantry
Sergeant W. Nye, Machine Gun Corps
Sergeant W. Older, Mounted Rifles
Sergeant C. Olmstead, Dragoons
Sergeant Major J. Page, Infantry
Sergeant Major F. A. Palmer, Field Artillery
Private B. Pay, Infantry
Quartermaster Sergeant R. McN. Pearson, Infantry
Corporal S. Pearson, Cavalry
Private H. Puddle, Machine Gun Corps
Company Sergeant Major E. H. Rashley, Engineers
Battery Quartermaster Sergeant J. F. Reed, Field Artillery
Sergeant P. Rogers, Mounted Rifles
Sergeant Major A. C. Simpson, Infantry O.N
Corporal E. J. Simpson, Railway Construction Corps
Sergeant F. B. Smith, Infantry
Private F. Stevens, Infantry
Sergeant H. C. Stone, Infantry
Acting Sergeant J. E. Walsh, Railway Troops
Company Sergeant Major C. Ward, Engineers
Sergeant A. Westlake, Field Artillery
Company Sergeant Major T. White, Infantry
Private E. W. Winnebeck, Infantry

Australian Force
Sergeant Major R. D. Allcroft, Field Artillery
Gunner C. E. Anderson, Field Artillery
Sergeant Major C. T. Ballingall 
Private W. F. Barker, Army Medical Corps
Sergeant W. N. Berkeley, Infantry
Private C. H. Blackmore, Infantry
Sergeant T. H. Briggs, Field Artillery
Sergeant G. C. Brodie, Engineers
Private W. E. Brown, Infantry
Sergeant L. Buchanan, Pioneers
Gunner A. N. Burton, Field Artillery
Sergeant R. L. Busteed, Pioneers
Company Sergeant Major T. S. Carter, Infantry
Sergeant E. A. Chisholm, Infantry
Private D. Clunes, Infantry
Company Sergeant Major R. H. Dennis, Infantry
Sergeant Major J. H. Dunne, Infantry
Company Sergeant Major W. Edgar, Machine Gun Corps
Sergeant Major W. J. Ferridge, Field Artillery
Sergeant Major A. Fitzsimmons, Field Artillery
Private E. Gorham, Infantry
Sergeant P. J. Graham, Field Artillery
Sergeant A. E. Hack, Infantry
Sergeant J. J. Hickey, Light Trench Mortar Battery
Sergeant N. C. Hill, Infantry
Sapper W. Hockin, Engineers
Company Sergeant Major G. J. Horder, Pioneers
Driver R. E. Humphreys, Army Service Corps
Sergeant P. Jarry, Engineers
Corporal F. D. Johnson, Infantry
Company Sergeant Major D. C. Kilpatrick, Pioneers
Sergeant H. C. Bang, Infantry
Sergeant Major M. Littlewood, Infantry
Corporal H. A. Lord, Pioneers
Company Sergeant Major L. J. Mathias, Infantry
Company Sergeant Major H. McCabe, Infantry
Sergeant A. T. McLean, Light Trench Mortar Battery
Private J. Miller, Infantry
Sergeant S. R Murdock, Infantry
Sergeant A. J. Murphy, Engineers
Private J. F. Murphy, Army Medical Corps
Corporal J. Nancarrow, Engineers
Sergeant F. L. Partridge, Infantry
Private S. S. Rawcliffe, Infantry
Sergeant L. J. Savage, Infantry
Sergeant C. A. Schwab  Army Medical Corps
Corporal R. J. Shippick, Infantry
Private T. Simpson, Infantry
Sergeant H. T. Stagg, Machine Gun Corps
Sergeant G. Stewart, Field Artillery
Company Sergeant Major R. Sykes, Machine Gun Corps
Sergeant R. A. H. Taggart, Light Horse
Company Sergeant Major H. Todd, Infantry
Gunner (Lance Brigadier) J. R. Tulloch, Field Artillery
Company Sergeant Major D. Walker, Infantry
Sergeant G. E. Watkins, Infantry
Private D. White, Machine Gun Corps
Sergeant J. Williams, Field Artillery
Corporal G. Wilson, Trench Mortar Battery

New Zealand Force
Company Sergeant Major R. A. Boyd, Wellington Regiment
Sergeant Major E. J. Conlon, Rifle Brigade
Company Sergeant Major L. T. Daniell, Rifle Brigade
Sergeant H. Fraser, Rifle Brigade
Corporal W. B. Goile, Field Artillery
Sergeant R. H. Halligan  Canterbury Regiment
Sergeant J. L. Hill, Auckland Regiment
Company Sergeant Major A. McFadyen, Otago Regiment
Lance Corporal J. MacPherson, Otago Regiment
Sergeant Major L. G. Morrison, Field Artillery
Corporal A. Neilson, Engineers
Corporal A. Notton, Wellington Regiment
Private T. R. O'Connor, Auckland Regiment
Sergeant W. E. Randell, Auckland Regiment
Corporal B. R. Turner, Canterbury Regiment
Sergeant D. C. Waterson, Auckland Regiment

South African Force
Bombardier F. Hughes, Heavy Artillery
Sergeant A. Smith, Infantry
Corporal W. Stuart, Infantry

Newfoundland Force
Private T. A. Pittman  Royal Newfoundland Regiment

In recognition of valuable services rendered with the Forces in Italy —
Corporal W. Adams, South Staffordshire Regiment (Hanley)
Company Sergeant Major H. Aungiers, Durham Light Infantry (Grangetown)
Sergeant Major T. Ayers, Royal Garrison Artillery (London)
Sergeant S. G. Bellamy, Royal Field Artillery (Taunton)
Sergeant J. Bolt, Devonshire Regiment (N. Tawton)
Sergeant A. Bracken, Royal Field Artillery (Bethnal Green, London)
Sergeant W. J. Bradley, Honourable Artillery Company (Spitalfields)
Private R. Brighten, Norfolk Regiment, attd. Trench Mortar Battery (Norwich)
Corporal M. Brown, Military Mounted Police (Oxford)
Sergeant W. Carter, Royal West Kent Regiment (Tonbridge)
Corporal J. Clarke, Royal Garrison Artillery (Seacombe)
Battery Quartermaster Sergeant R. Coldwell, Royal Field Artillery (Plaistow)
Company Sergeant Major F. G. Collis  Hampshire Regiment (Portsmouth)
Fitter T. Cooper, Royal Field Artillery (Chesterfield)
Sergeant E. K. Courtier, Gloucestershire Regiment (Bristol)
Company Quartermaster Sergeant. E. Cox  Royal West Surrey Regiment (Strood)
Sergeant H. W. Creighton, Military Mounted Police (W. Kensington)
Company Sergeant Major H. E. Cufets, Royal Warwickshire Regiment (Birmingham)
Sergeant A. J. Davis, R. E. (Bristol)
Gunner W. Davis, Royal Field Artillery (Petersfield)
Sergeant R. Day, Gloucestershire Regiment (Bristol)
Company Sergeant Major A. E. W. F. Easterbrook, Royal Engineers (Gillingham)
Gunner T. Emerton, Royal Field Artillery (Gateshead)
Driver S. H. Faulkner, Royal Field Artillery (Gloucester)
Company Sergeant Major W. Fisher, South Staffordshire Regiment (Tipton)
Lance Corporal D. R. Frame, Gordon Highlanders (Ardrossan)
Gunner T. Frost, Royal Garrison Artillery (Stafford)
Sergeant W. Gardner, Yorkshire Regiment (Middlesbrough)
Acting Corporal T. Garmory, York and Lancaster Regiment (Kirkcudbright)
Corporal M. Gaskell, Royal Garrison Artillery (E Barnsley)
Private H. Gee, King's Own Scottish Borderers (Salford)
Sergeant W. H. Gilbert, Royal Sussex Regiment (Rye)
Regimental Quartermaster Sergeant. F. J. Godfrey, Duke of Cornwall's Light Infantry (Northfleet)
Sergeant F. J. Graves, Royal Welsh Fusiliers (Birkenhead)
Sergeant T. W. Green, Royal Field Artillery (Manchester)
Company Sergeant Major G H. Gridley, Royal Warwickshire Regiment (Homerton)
Sergeant Major C. W. G. Harrop, Royal Garrison Artillery (Brighton)
Company Sergeant Major F. W. Hayes, Royal Warwickshire Regiment (Birmingham)
Corporal W. L. Haywood, Machine Gun Corps (Haringay)
Lance Corporal J. I. Hooson, Machine Gun Corps (Mt. Tabor)
Sergeant E. J. Hurst  Royal Engineers (Brighton)
Sergeant A. James, Gloucestershire Regiment (Bristol)
Sergeant H. C. Johnson, Royal Field Artillery (Bournemouth)
Sergeant W. Johnson, Northumberland Fusiliers (Gateshead)
Sergeant J. P. Kelly, Yorkshire Regiment (Washington Station)
Corporal A. F. Laffling, Royal West Kent Regiment (Hoo-in-Avochester)
Company Sergeant Major C. Loveday, Oxfordshire & Buckinghamshire Light Infantry (Plumstead, S.E.)
Private J. McCartney, Machine Gun Corps (Parkhead)
Sergeant S. Mallinson, Royal Field Artillery (Whitehaven)
Company Sergeant Major S. G. Merrick, Royal Warwickshire Regiment (Birmingham)
Sergeant S. A. Miles, Royal Garrison Artillery (Dover)
Company Sergeant Major A. Mills, Manchester Regiment (Oldham)
Corporal A. Mitchrier, Royal Warwickshire Regiment (Kenilworth)
Company Sergeant Major H. Morgan, East Surrey Regiment (Fulham, S.W.)
Company Quartermaster Sergeant A. J. Morshead, Devonshire Regiment (Tufnell Park, London, N.)
Act Corporal H. Mucklow, Royal Warwickshire Regiment (Birmingham)
Corporal A. E. Nabbs, Royal Field Artillery (Pontygwaith)
Private W. Neilson, Northumberland Fusiliers, attd. Trench Mortar Battery (Bradford)
Corporal H. S. Nickols, Royal Warwickshire Regiment (Dawlish)
Sergeant Major T. J. O'Driscoll, Royal Field Artillery (Cork)
Company Sergeant Major F. Pattison, West Riding Regiment (Stocksfield-on-Tyne)
Private J. H. Pearson, Royal Welsh Fusiliers (Brierley Hill)
Sergeant W. J. R. Pook, Royal Field Artillery (Bristol)
Sergeant G. A. Rae, Royal Field Artillery (W. Haftlepool)
2nd Corporal A. H. Reid, Royal Engineers (Wimbledon)
Gunner E. Rolfe, Royal Garrison Artillery (Cippenham)
Driver Rolfe, Royal Field Artillery (Beaconsfield)
Sergeant F. Round, Royal Warwickshire Regiment (Warwick)
Private H. Rushby, Machine Gun Corps (Sutton-on-Trent)
Sergeant G. Salvage, Royal Garrison Artillery (Lewes)
Sergeant W. Stevens, Royal Garrison Artillery (Woolwich)
Temp Sergeant Major J. A. Stewart, Manchester Regiment (Manchester)
Sergeant Major G. H. Stonock, Royal Garrison Artillery (E. Fakenham)
Gunner J. Taylor, Royal Garrison Artillery (Longton)
Company Sergeant Major S. Teddar, Royal West Surrey Regiment (Chobham)
Private S. Thomas, Devonshire Regiment (Plymouth)
Driver J. Thompson, Royal Field Artillery (Fulford)
Sergeant T. Vincent, Cavalry (W. Baling)
Sergeant E. A. Wellington, Royal Fusiliers (Warrington)
Sergeant A. Wanklin, Worcestershire Regiment (Bromsgrove)
Sergeant J. Wardman  West Riding Regiment (nr. Keighley)
Sergeant I. Warner, Machine Gun Corps (Birmingham)
Sergeant B. Washington, Bedfordshire Regiment (Rickmansworth)
Company Sergeant Major J. Welsh, York and Lancaster Regiment (Edinburgh)
Corporal F. Williams, Army Corps of Clerks (Newport, Isle of Wight)
Sergeant T. Woods, York and Lancaster Regiment (St. Helens)

For distinguished services in connection with Military Operations with the British Forces in Salonika —

Regimental Sergeant Major A. W. Andrews, East Kent Regiment (Upchurch, near Sittingbourne)
Regimental Sergeant Major E. E. W. Baker, East Surrey Regiment (Stockwell, London)
Sergeant J. W. Bennett, Royal Field Artillery (Edmonton, N.)
Lance Sergeant T. A. Burke, Wiltshire Regiment (Paddington)
Private C. Carmichael, Royal Highlanders (Tighnabruaich)
Company Sergeant Major F. Challen, Border Regiment (Woolwich)
Regimental Sergeant Major D. C. Christie, Royal Highlanders (Dundee)
Staff Sergeant B. Cockburn, Royal Army Medical Corps (Southampton)
Private A. Davidson, Cameron Highlanders (Tomalin)
Sergeant A. Edley, York and Lancaster Regiment (Sheffield)
Regimental Sergeant Major G. Edwards, Royal Scots (Holywood, Co. Down)
Company Sergeant Major J. Fernie, Argyll and Sutherland Highlanders (Falkirk)
Company Sergeant Major W. Flynn, South Lancashire Regiment (Wigan)
Regimental Sergeant Major A. P. Gough, Cheshire Regiment (Runcorn, Cheshire)
Sergeant G. Grant, Cheshire Regiment (Elkington, South Louth)
Driver J. A. Graves, Royal Field Artillery (Hemingbrough, Howden)
Regimental Sergeant Major G. F. Healy, Royal Fusiliers (Chertsey)
Sergeant J. Johnson  Cameron Highlanders (Lochcarnan South Dist.)
Lance Captain I. Mclntosh, Argyll and Sutherland Highlanders (Paisley)
Captain W. McMillan, Royal Scots (Bathgate)
Sergeant J. Markham, Royal Garrison Artillery (Brighton)
Sergeant S. J. Martin, Royal Garrison Artillery (Delgany)
Company Sergeant Major W. J. Martin, South Wales Borderers (Newport, Mon.)
Captain E. Milne, Cameron Highlanders (Larkhall)
Squadron Sergeant Major O. C. Packer, Yeomanry (Dulwich, S.S.)
Sergeant J. Pearson, Cheshire Regiment (Stockport)
Company Sergeant Major J. Petrie, Argyll and Sutherland Highlanders (St. Andrews)
Company Sergeant Major Arthur John Seymour Piddington, Duke of Cornwall's Light Infantry (Aston, Rowant)
Company Sergeant Major H. Potter, Liverpool Regiment (Bolton)
Sergeant A. J. Ross, Oxfordshire and Buckinghamshire Light Infantry (Stony Stratford)
Sergeant G. Smith, Lancashire Fusiliers (Morton, near Manchester)
Sergeant T. Wooldridge, Military Mounted Police (Sandhurst, Berks.)

Awarded a Bar to the Distinguished Conduct Medal (DCM*) 
For distinguished service in connection with Military Operations with the Armies in France and Flanders —
Private H. Blackmore  Hussars (S. Africa)
Company Sergeant Major W. Fisher  West Riding Regiment (Huddersfield)
Company Sergeant Major C. L. Ives  London Regiment (Norwich)
Acting Sergeant Major A. Lee, East Surrey Regiment (Fulham)
Company Sergeant Major J. Malia  Border Regiment (Chesterfield)
Company Sergeant Major E. Oldridge, Durham Light Infantry (Darlington)
Sergeant J. Parke  MM Norfolk Regiment (E. Harling)
Sergeant J. Pearson  South Wales Borderers (U. Parkstone)
Company Sergeant Major H. Schofield  West Riding Regiment (Huddersfield)
Sergeant Major W. T. Shireeffs  Royal Field Artillery (Aberdeen)
Sergeant E. Spalding  Suffolk Regiment (Hengrave)
Sergeant Major H. F. Spratley  Royal Garrison Artillery (Paddington)
Sergeant E. W. Surplice  Royal Engineers (Birmingham)
Sergeant J. Tugby  Machine Gun Corps (South Shields)
Sergeant G. T. Vernon  Royal Field Artillery (Liverpool)

Meritorious Service Medal (MSM)

References

Birthday Honours
1918 awards
1918 in Australia
1918 in Canada
1918 in India
1918 in New Zealand
1918 in the United Kingdom